= Bloody Springs massacre =

1757 killings in Pennsylvania, US

- Part of French and Indian War
- Modern day Berks County in Pennsylvania
- Location: 40°50′46″N 76°17′36″W near Strausstown, Pennsylvania
- Date: October 1, 1757
- Attack type: Mass murder
- Deaths: 6
- Victims: Spatz family, German settlers
- Assailant: Lenape warriors

The Bloody Springs massacre was an attack by Lenape warriors on homesteads in what is now Berks County, Pennsylvania, on October 1, 1757, during the French and Indian War. The Spatz family and other settlers were killed at a spring near modern-day Strausstown, Pennsylvania, causing the water to run red with the blood of the family. The story of the massacre has been passed down through the Degler family, whose farm was adjacent to the Spatz homestead.

== Background ==
In 1682, William Penn had signed a peace agreement with the Lenape tribe, however, German settlers forced the Lenape out of Berks County through the 1737 Walking Purchase and other land purchases that the Lenape regarded as unfair. The Lenape were pushed up the Schuylkill River over time. They then moved out of Berks County and westward towards Ohio, but were resentful about it. By the 1750s, the French offered support for the Lenape to attack settlers in Berks County in small raiding parties. As conflict between the English and the French escalated, the Six Nations allied with the British. Some Lenape, led by warriors such as Shingas and Captain Jacobs, sided with the French and carried out raids against Pennsylvania settlements. Others, such as Teedyuscung, tried to maintain good relations with the provincial government.

At the time of the Bloody Spring massacre, Tulpehocken Township had become the frontier in the French and Indian War, as the few European settlers who had established farms north of the Blue Mountain fled southward. The French and Indian War is the only armed conflict in which people were killed within the borders of Berks County.

Conrad Weiser, Pennsylvania's long-time ambassador to the Six Nations in today's central New York, directed the construction of forts to protect the German farm families in the northern part of Tulpehocken Township (now Upper Tulpehocken Township, established in 1820) from Native American attacks. One of these forts built for that purpose was Fort Northkill, erected in early 1756 following the initial Lenape incursion in November 1755. However, the small stockade (approximately 32 feet square) was poorly constructed, and the hastily built house inside was ill-suited to shelter refugees in inclement weather. By 1757, Lenape warriors were attacking settlers south of the Blue Mountain in the vicinity of the Spatz and Degler homesteads.

One hundred and fifty Berks County residents were killed and about 150 were kidnapped by the Lenape tribe during the French and Indian War. Amish Berks County residents, who did not believe in violence for religious reasons, were killed when the Lenape attacked their homes. Many women and children were also kidnapped. Kidnapped people would often be ransomed back, but not always. At the end of the French and Indian War, a number of captives decided to remain with the tribes that kidnapped them because they had integrated into the tribe.

== Massacre of the Spatz family ==
On October 1, 1757, Lenape from the Ohio Valley attacked near Fort Northkill in Tulpehocken Township. There are various versions of the Spatz and Degler stories, but no contemporaneous accounts (such as military journals or reports to colonial authorities) have been found. Some sources report that someone in the Spatz family killed an Indian, and in retaliation his companions killed the entire family of six. The Spatz family and other settlers were killed at a spring near modern-day Strausstown, probably Little Northkill Creek (sometimes called Degler Spring, a tributary of Northkill Creek). The name Bloody Springs is derived from the claim that the blood of the settlers dyed the river red. An application was made to Conrad Weiser in Reading for help. Captain Oswald sent two lieutenants and forty men from the Royal American Regiment to assist residents in that area.

The massacre is frequently confused with the Hochstetler massacre, which occurred at the nearby Northkill Amish Settlement 12 days earlier.

== The Degler chest ==
Frederick Degler emigrated from Germany in 1738 and settled on what was then Berks County's northern frontier, near present-day Strausstown in Upper Tulpehocken Township, Pennsylvania. He brought with him a cedar chest, which would become a treasured family heirloom.

Degler maintained a good relationship with Native Americans in the area, often sharing food with them. When attacks on Pennsylvania settlements began to threaten his community, Degler and his family took refuge at Fort Northkill. The Indians assumed that he had therefore become an enemy, and attacked his home.

After killing the Spatz family, the Lenape Indians went to the Degler home and ransacked it. They broke open Degler's cedar chest with tomahawks, thinking that he was hiding inside it. When Degler returned to his home, the Indians apologized for breaking the chest. As a token of their regained friendship, the Indians repaired the chest top which they had split and carved on it two fish, as a sign that the Deglers gave the Indians food, a heart symbol of friendship, and crossed canoe paddles, an emblem of peace. Degler also carved his initials on the chest and the year, 1757.

== Memorialization ==
A stone marker was placed at the site of the massacre on June 19, 1915, by the Historical Society of Berks County.
