= Northkill =

Northkill may refer to the following in the U.S. state of Pennsylvania:

- Northkill Amish Settlement, in Berks County
- Northkill Creek, a tributary of Tulpehocken Creek
