= Hochstetler massacre =

Attack on settlers in colonial Pennsylvania

- Part of French and Indian War
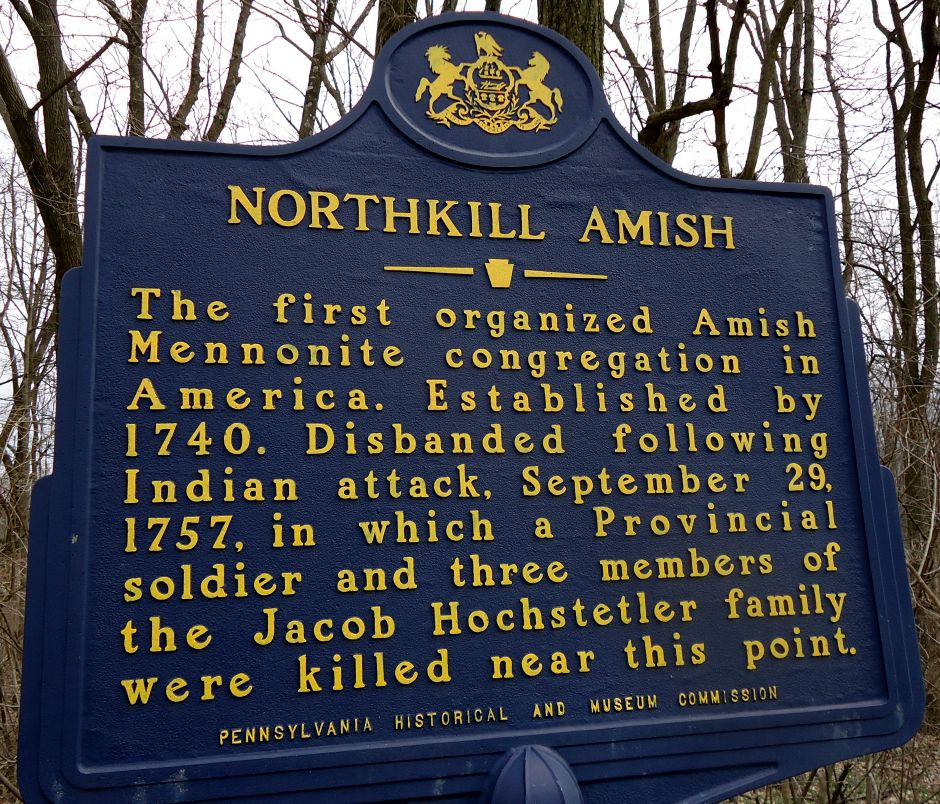
- Historical marker at the site of the massacre in the Northkill Amish Settlement

- Approximate location of the Hochstetler massacre
- Location: 40°33′0″N 75°59′0″W near Hamburg, Pennsylvania
- Date: September 19, 1757 (disputed)
- Attack type: Mass murder
- Deaths: 3 settlers, 1 soldier
- Victims: Hochstetler family, Swiss settlers
- Assailants: 15 Lenape and Shawnee warriors

The Hochstetler massacre was an attack on a farmstead at the Northkill Amish Settlement in September or October 1757, in which three Amish settlers were killed and three others taken into captivity. The attack was one of many assaults by French-allied Lenape and Shawnee warriors on Pennsylvania settlements during the French and Indian War. For religious reasons, the Amish settlers refused to defend themselves, and everyone in the homestead was either killed or captured. One of the captives, 45-year-old Jacob Hochstetler, escaped captivity after about eight months, and his two sons were later returned through a peace agreement brokered in 1763.

== Background ==
The Hochstetler family is thought to have originated near Schwarzenburg, Switzerland, in the fourteenth or fifteenth century. In the 1600s some members of the family joined the Anabaptist reform movement. Because of their adherence to the doctrines of believer's baptism and non-resistance, Anabaptists suffered severe persecution, and beginning in the 1700s many of them immigrated to America to find religious freedom. Jacob Hochstetler and his family arrived in Philadelphia in 1738. By 1739 the family had settled along the Northkill Creek on the eastern edge of the Blue Mountains in what is now Berks County, Pennsylvania, at that time the western frontier of the British colonies. They built a homestead and farm buildings, cleared the land for farming, and planted several acres of fruit trees. They helped to establish the first Amish Mennonite church in America in the Northkill area in 1740.

The Northkill Amish Settlement was on the edge of the legal boundary of European settlement according to agreements with Native Americans. The area was part of the traditional home of the Lenape Indians, who had been forced to relocate by several unfair land purchase agreements, most notably the Walking Purchase of 1739. The growing European population had reduced the availability of game that the Indians depended on, and relations with the settlers were often tense. By the early 1750s, many Lenape had moved into the Ohio Country and were accepting French support. At the start of the French and Indian War, Lenape warriors, often accompanied by French soldiers, began attacking farms and settlements in Pennsylvania.

== Massacre ==
On September 19, 1757 (see below for a discussion of dates), the Hochstetler family had a gathering of local neighbors to pare and slice apples for drying. After the guests departed, the family dog began barking, and Joseph Hochstetler opened the front door. He was shot in the leg by Lenape warriors, about ten of whom, under the command of three French scouts, had entered the Northkill settlement. The Hochstetlers had firearms in the home (which they used for hunting), and the two sons, Joseph and Christian, aged 11 and 13 years, loaded their guns to defend the family, but their father, Jacob Hochstetler Sr., adhered to the Anabaptist Christian doctrine of nonresistance and refused to allow weapons to be used against the Indians.

At dawn, the Indians set the house on fire, then stood guard around the house so the family could not escape without risking their lives. As the fire worsened, the family fled into the cellar, using apple cider to wet the floorboards overhead, but as the smoke threatened to asphyxiate them, they decided to try to escape out the cellar window, as they could not see any of their attackers, and presumed that the warriors had left. One Indian, however, who was known as Tom Lions, had remained nearby to eat peaches. He observed that Anna (Lorentz) Hochstetler had gotten stuck in the window during her escape and he called the other warriors. Anna was stabbed in the back and scalped. Another daughter (name unknown) and Jacob Jr. were killed. Jacob Sr. and Christian Hochstetler were taken captive, and Joseph escaped, although the Indians soon recaptured him. All this was witnessed by an older brother, John Hochstetler, who had come from his neighboring farm and was watching from concealment.

Newspapers also reported the death of a soldier, Philip Sommer, on the same day, although the circumstances are unknown.

=== Date of the massacre ===
There is some disagreement as to the date of the massacre. The Hochstetler family history states that the massacre took place on September 19, but two contemporary newspaper articles give different dates. The Pennsylvania Journal of (Thursday) October 6th reported: "From Reading we have advice that last Wednesday [September 29] the enemy burnt the house of one Hochsteller and killed Hochsteller’s wife and a young man, and himself and three of his children are missing." On the same day, the Pennsylvania Gazette reported: "From Reading, in Berks County, there is Advice, that on Thursday and Friday last [September 30 and October 1] some people were murdered in Bern Township by the Indians, and others carried off." In Jacob Hochstetler's own account of his escape, he reported the date of the attack as October 12. In support of the September 19 date, Captain Jacob Orndt, commander at Fort Allen, reported on September 20, 1757: "Jacob Houghstetler and family, five killed and one wounded." Many modern publications give September 29 as the date of the massacre.

== Jacob Hochstetler's captivity ==
Jacob Hochstetler was held captive until he escaped and traveled to Fort Augusta in May 1758. He was interviewed at Fort Augusta about his experiences on May 5, 1758, in front of Colonel Henry Bouquet. He told the examiners that his home was assaulted on October 12, 1757 by 15 Lenape and Shawnee warriors, and he was taken by them to Fort Machault, a journey on foot and by boat which took 17 days. The following day he was taken to Fort Presque Isle. Three days after this, he was sent to a Native American community "above Venango" on the Allegheny River, identified as the Seneca village of Buckaloons, where he remained until April 1758, about 8 months. He reported that, after some time, he was trusted to go hunting alone and decided to escape. After walking east for six days he reached the Susquehanna River. He followed it for another four days, then he constructed a crude bark raft and floated downriver for five more days until he reached Fort Augusta. Colonel James Burd wrote to Governor William Denny that he had seen Hochstetler floating downriver on the raft and had some soldiers help him to shore. Hochstetler told the examiners that for the last few days of his escape journey, he ate only grass.

== Aftermath ==
Jacob's two sons were separated from him at Fort Presque Isle, where the two boys were sold or given to Native American families. Jacob later learned that Christian had been adopted by the Lenape chief Custaloga. On August 13, 1762 Jacob petitioned Governor James Hamilton for assistance in getting his sons back. After Colonel Henry Bouquet negotiated a peace treaty with the Lenape, they were released to the British colonial authorities with over 200 other European captives in October 1764.

Soon afterwards, Joseph was handed over to British authorities at Fort Augusta, and on parting, his Native American family encouraged him to visit them and to consider them "brothers". Reportedly he returned frequently to the village where he had been held captive. He always maintained that if their father had allowed them to shoot at their attackers, the Indians would have fled.

Hochstetler family tradition says that Christian had been living in a village in Ohio and, after being handed over to Colonel Bouquet's troops at their camp on the Muskingum River, he made his way back to the Northkill Amish Settlement. In 1765, he arrived at the home when the family was eating dinner and they offered him food, not recognizing him due to his Native American dress and haircut. Later, as Christian was sitting on a stump outside the home, Jacob Hochstetler approached him, and Christian told him his name, speaking in broken German. Christian was welcomed back into the community, married, and eventually converted to the Schwarzenau Brethren, for whom he became a minister.

Altogether, more than one hundred and fifty Berks County residents were killed and about 150 were kidnapped by Native Americans during the French and Indian War.

== Memorialization ==
A historical marker referring to the Hochstetler massacre was erected in 1959 near Hamburg, Pennsylvania by the Pennsylvania Historical and Museum Commission.

== See also ==
- Anti-Amish sentiment
- Bloody Springs massacre
- Great Cove massacre
- Penn's Creek massacre
- Gnadenhütten massacre (Pennsylvania)
