= Fort Lebanon =

18th century fort in colonial Pennsylvania

- Schuylkill County, Pennsylvania (near Auburn, Pennsylvania)

Site information
- Type: Military fort

Location
- Location of Fort Lebanon in Pennsylvania
- Coordinates: 40°36′46″N 76°04′43″W

Site history
- Built: 1755
- In use: 1756–1758
- Battles/wars: French and Indian War

Garrison information
- Past commanders: Captain Jacob Morgan; Captain Christian Busse
- Garrison: 22-53 men plus officers

Pennsylvania Historical Marker
- Designated: 1949

Fort Lebanon (known after July 1757 as Fort William) was a Pennsylvania stockade fort built in December 1755 and designed to provide protection for settlers' families during the French and Indian War. However, Native American war parties often attacked nearby farms and killed settlers, disappearing before the fort's troops could respond. The garrison was sometimes fewer than 25 men as troops were transferred for temporary duty elsewhere, meaning that the fort had little manpower for patrols or to pursue attackers. The fort was renamed Fort William in mid-1757. In May 1758, the garrison was transferred and the fort was never re-occupied.

== History ==
At the beginning of the French and Indian War, Braddock's defeat left Pennsylvania without a professional military force. Lenape chiefs Shingas and Captain Jacobs launched dozens of Shawnee and Delaware raids against British colonial settlements, killing and capturing hundreds of colonists and destroying settlements across western and central Pennsylvania. In late 1755, Colonel John Armstrong wrote to Governor Robert Hunter Morris: "I am of the opinion that no other means of defense than a chain of blockhouses along or near the south side of the Kittatinny Mountains from the Susquehanna to the temporary line, can secure the lives and property of the inhabitants of this country."

=== Construction ===
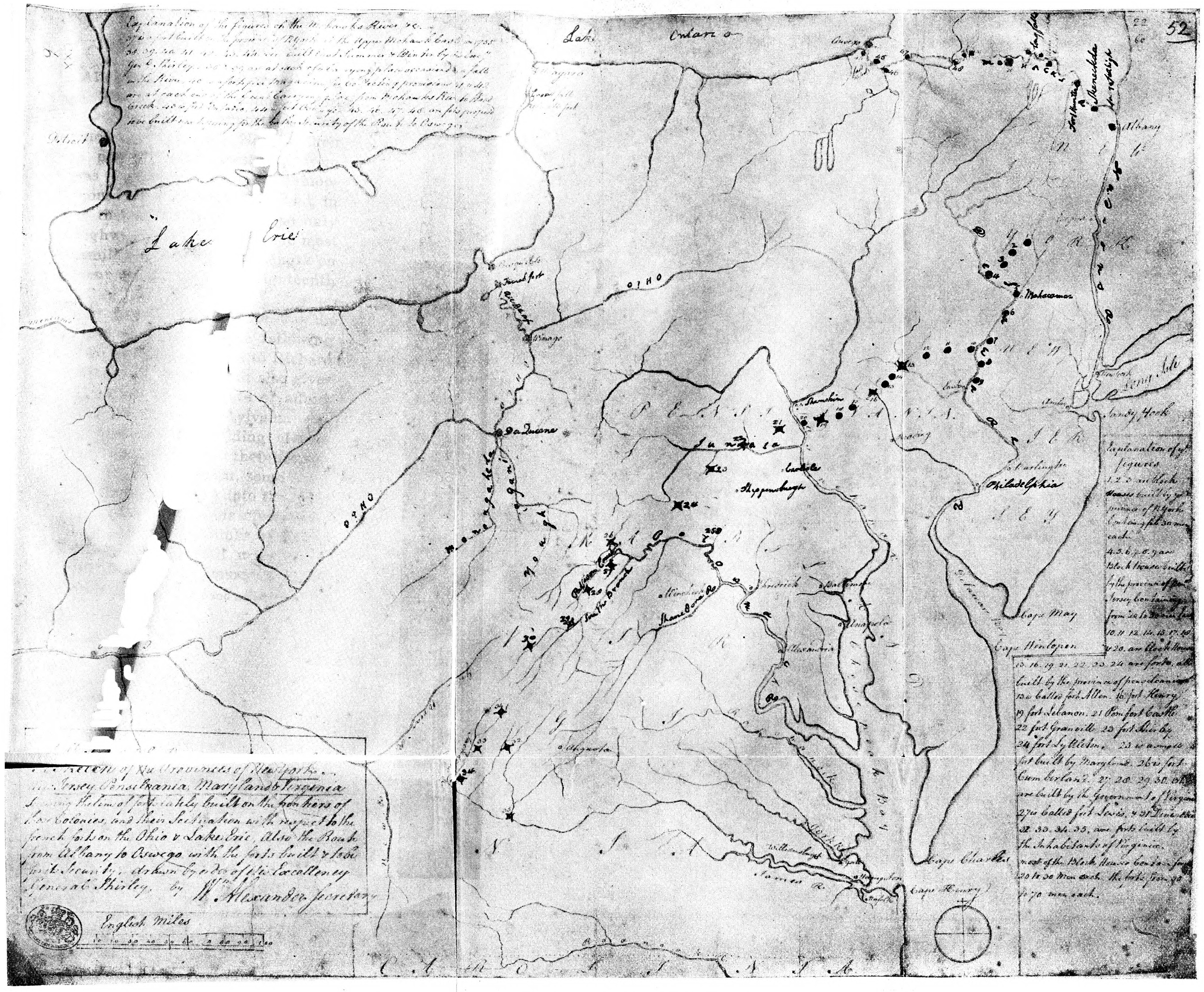
1756 map of Pennsylvania forts and blockhouses, showing Fort Lebanon (number 19), upper right from the map's center, just below Shamokin.

Fort Lebanon was located just northeast of present-day Auburn, Pennsylvania, at the forks of the Schuylkill River and was intended to guard a gap in the mountains, cut by the river, that Native Americans used when travelling into Eastern Pennsylvania. Although there was no nearby township, over a hundred families had recently settled in the area and needed protection. The fort was built in three weeks under the supervision of Captain Jacob Morgan, at about the same time as Fort Northkill, in December 1755. The fort was 100 feet square with 14-foot-high stockade walls and a barracks, 30 feet by 20 feet, with a storeroom inside. A 12-foot-square gunpowder magazine had a cellar for the safe storage of powder. Two other buildings were later added for the refuge of settlers' families, and the fort was constructed so that a spring flowed through it, for fresh drinking water. Major William Parsons visited the fort in May 1756 and wrote:

"The Fort is situate in a fine Plain in the Neighbourhood of several good plantations, which are now inhabited by their respective Owners. But it is rather too much crowded with Buildings which in Case of an Attack would much hinder the Garrison. Some of those Buildings were erected for the Accommodation of Several of the poor adjacent Inhabitants last Winter but some of them are proposed to be removed for the better Accommodating of the Garrison; and when this is done there will be convenient Room within the Fort to parade and exercise the Men; and the whole will be more light and airy. Here is also great Complaint for want of Ammunition."

Commissary General James Young visited the fort in June 1756 and wrote:

"Fort Lebanon...is situated in a Plain, on one side is a Plantation, on the other a Barren Pretty Clear of Woods all round, only a few trees about 50 yards from the Fort, which I desired might be cut down...[The] Fort is a square of about 100 feet well staccoded with good Bastions, on one side of which is a Good Wall Piece, within is a good Guard house for the People, and two other Large houses built by the Country people who have taken refuge here, in all 6 Families."

At the time, the fort was one of the largest in the defensive chain of forts east of the Susquehanna River.

=== Military history ===
1759 map of the Province of Pennsylvania, showing "Fort William" in the upper central panel, near the right fold.

The settlements around the fort were frequently attacked during 1756. On March 6 1756, the Pennsylvania Gazette reported:

We hear from Berks County, that on Saturday Evening last the House and Barn of Barnabas Sictle, and the Mill of Peter Conrad, were burnt down, and the Wife of Balsar Neytong killed, and his Son, a Child of eight years old, taken Captive, by three Indians; and the next Morning Sictle's Servant informed Captain Morgan of the Mischief done at his Master's Plantation, whereupon he, with seven of his Men immediately went in Search of the Enemy, but did not meet with any."

Attacks continued during the summer months and farmers in the fields were vulnerable, therefore Lieutenant Colonel Conrad Weiser ordered Captain Morgan to post sentries to protect the people during harvest Time.

In October, the garrison at Fort Lebanon was reduced to 22 when 19 men were sent to Fort Augusta. Fort Northkill had a garrison of only 9 men and an officer. On November 3, a child was taken, and two men were killed, and three persons were killed and three taken captive near Fort Lebanon, but the garrison was too depleted to mount an effective response, even though the fort had been built to protect the civilian population. On November 4, Captain Morgan wrote to Governor Denny, requesting reinforcements:

"That having two Forts belonging to one Company, and my Men to the Number of 19 was drafted from me, being total but Fifty-Three, Your Petitioner thinks himself too weak to be of any Service to the Frontiers, seeing the Enemy commits violent Outrages nigh the Forts; as Yesterday, the 3d of November, I found 3 Persons Scalped, and there is 3 more missing within a Mile of Fort Lebanon, & 2 Men killed and one took Captive within ½ Mile of the Fort at Northkill, and dangerous it is to keep ye Forts if there was a Superiority in Number to besiege them, So your Petitioner in Humility begs that your Honour would take ye Premising into Consideration."

James Read wrote to Colonel Weiser the same day that "By a Gentleman who left Fort Lebanon yesterday afternoon, I hear that Sixty Women and Children have fled into it for Refuge, and several Families have come further into the Settlements, with their Household Goods & Stock." On November 26, ten men were transferred from Fort Augusta back to Fort Lebanon, for a total garrison of 32 soldiers.

In May 1757 Captain Morgan and 30 men were sent to Fort Augusta for three months, and Captain Busse at Fort Henry took command of Fort Lebanon. Colonel Weiser sent reinforcements to Fort Lebanon in June, but a sergeant and 9 men were sent in July to stand guard during a conference at Easton. Native American war parties continued to attack local farms, killing two or three people at a time and taking children. Troops sent out to pursue the attackers found only the warriors' tracks. Regular patrols failed to prevent these attacks. In July the decision was made to change the fort's name to Fort William, probably in honor of Prince William Augustus, Duke of Cumberland, son of King George II.

On September 19 1757, the Hochstetler farm at the Northkill Amish Settlement was attacked and burned, and there is no record of a response from the fort. On October 1, the farms of the Spatz family and the Degler family were destroyed, and six members of the Spatz family were killed. Forty soldiers and two lieutenants from the Royal American Regiment were sent from Reading to protect the other farms. In late September, Governor Denny ordered Fort Northkill to be abandoned.

In January, 1758, Adjutant Jacob Kern reported that "Capt morgans Company being 53 men and all in Good order this fort is of Little Service to the Country." Colonel James Burd visited Fort William in February and reported: "Reviewed the Garrison & found 53 good men but diffitient [deficient] in Dissipline...no Arms fitt for use, no Kettles nor tools." The decision was made soon after this to abandon the fort.

=== Abandonment ===
By mid-1758, British forces started gaining control of the French and Indian War and Indian attacks in the Blue Mountains of Pennsylvania were subsiding. On May 11, Deputy Governor William Denny ordered the troops stationed at Fort William to join British military units as they were advancing on French outposts. By 1896 only the dried-up streambed and a depression in the earth left over from the gunpowder magazine were still visible.

== Memorialization ==
A stone monument with a brass plaque was erected near the site of the fort on Fort Lebanon Road in 1913 by the Mahantongo Chapter of the Daughters of the American Revolution of Pottsville, Pennsylvania. It was rededicated in 2023. A historical marker was placed at the intersection of Pennsylvania Route 895 and Fort Lebanon Road, in Auburn, Pennsylvania, in 1949 by the Pennsylvania Historical & Museum Commission.
