= Fort Henry (Pennsylvania) =

18th century fort in colonial Pennsylvania

- Berks County, Pennsylvania (near Bethel Township, Berks County, Pennsylvania)

Site information
- Type: Military fort

Location
- Location of Fort Henry in Pennsylvania
- Coordinates: 40°30′09″N 76°19′59″W

Site history
- Built: 1756
- In use: 1756–1759, 1763
- Battles/wars: French and Indian War; Pontiac's War

Garrison information
- Past commanders: Captain Christian Busse; Lieutenant Samuel Weiser
- Garrison: 17-109 Provincial troops

Pennsylvania Historical Marker
- Designated: 1959

Fort Henry was a stockade fort built in early 1756 in Berks County, Pennsylvania, to protect local settlers from Native American war parties, which were raiding the area frequently during the French and Indian War. It was one of the larger forts built in a defensive line, 12-20 miles apart, intended to safeguard the more densely populated communities of the eastern Province of Pennsylvania. It was abandoned in 1759, and then briefly put back into use in 1763 during Pontiac's War.

== History ==
1759 map of the Province of Pennsylvania, by Nicholas Scull II, showing Fort Henry just to the right of the map's center.

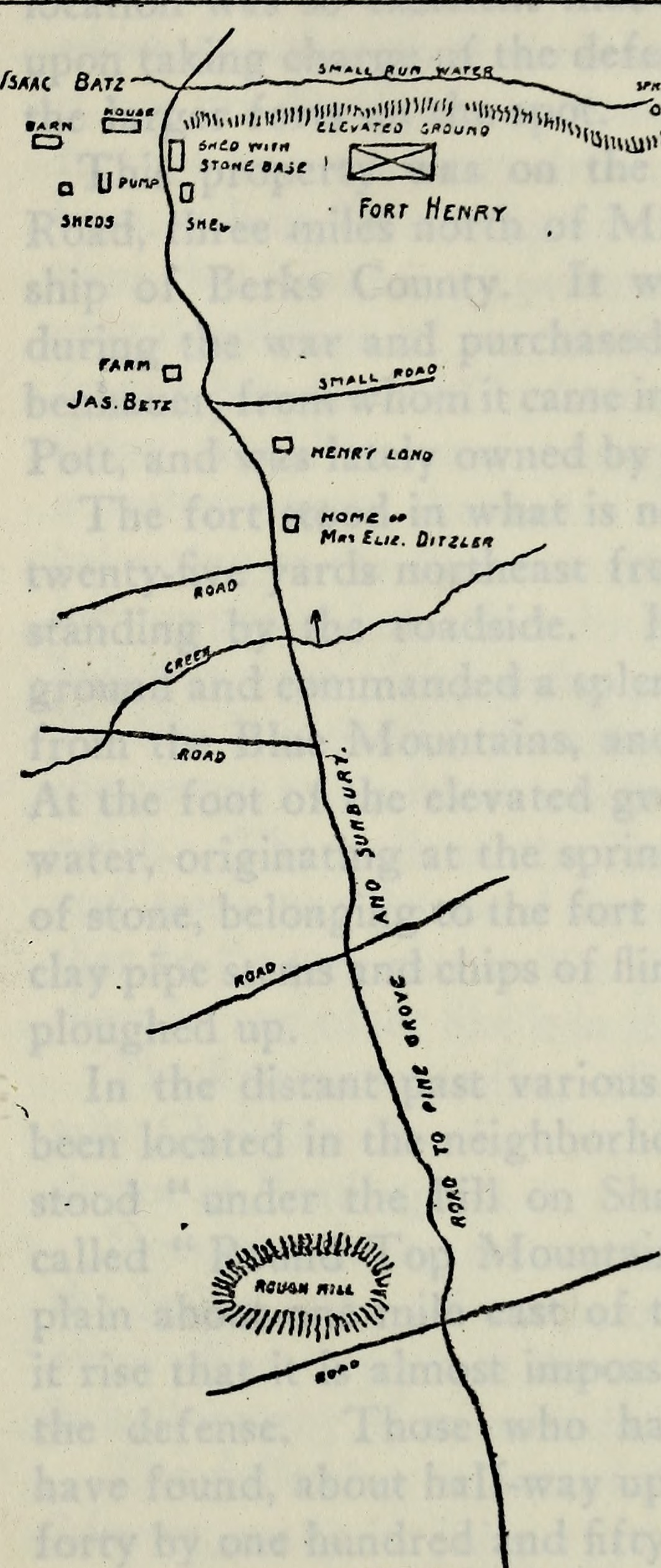
Location of Fort Henry in relation to roads and farms in Berks County.

At the beginning of the French and Indian War, Braddock's defeat at the Battle of Monongahela left Pennsylvania without a professional military force. Lenape chiefs Shingas and Captain Jacobs launched dozens of Shawnee and Delaware raids against British colonial settlements, killing and capturing hundreds of colonists and destroying settlements across western and central Pennsylvania. In late 1755, Colonel John Armstrong wrote to Governor Robert Hunter Morris: "I am of the opinion that no other means of defense than a chain of blockhouses along or near the south side of the Kittatinny Mountains from the Susquehanna to the temporary line, can secure the lives and property of the inhabitants of this country."

=== Tulpehocken massacre ===
In 1755, Native American warriors began systematically raiding and destroying Pennsylvania settlements. The Penn's Creek massacre took place on October 12 and the Great Cove massacre on November 1, along with numerous smaller assaults in which homes were burned and settlers killed or taken prisoner. The Pennsylvania Provincial Assembly, dominated by Quakers, was reluctant to take military action and refused to pass necessary funding bills to raise troops and construct forts, to the frustration of Governor Robert Morris.

On November 15, Native American warriors attacked a blockhouse built by farmer Dietrich Six and killed six settlers. The next morning, warriors attacked the Kobel family farm near Tulpehocken, killing Henry Kobel and his wife and three of his eight children, in what is known as the Kobel Massacre. On November 17 they attacked other farms in the area, killing 15 settlers, many of them children, and burning several homes. Conrad Weiser, who lived nearby, went to the town on November 18 to talk to Native American leaders. There he was confronted by an angry mob, furious to see him in the company of Native Americans. Community leaders demanded protection, petitioning the Assembly to "grant a sufficient Sum of Money to maintain such a Number of regular Troops as may be thought necessary to defend our Frontiers, and build Fortifications in proper Places." On November 26, Governor Morris succeeded in obtaining a grant of sixty thousand pounds from the Assembly, to build a string of defensive forts across central Pennsylvania, and to pay for the training, arming and provision of troops to defend the colony.

=== Location ===
In February 1756, Governor Morris wrote to George Washington that "on the east side of the Susquehanna the forts are about 10 or 12 miles asunder among which the most considerable [is] Fort Henry, at a pass through the mountains, called Tolihaio." The Tolehaio (or Tolihaio) Gap is sometimes referred to by another Native American name, the Swatara Gap, and refers to a water gap through Blue Mountains formed by Swatara Creek. Local settlers occasionally referred to the gap as "the Hole." It was of strategic military significance as a route used by Native American warriors to reach eastern Pennsylvania. The fort was built on land belonging to the farmer Dietrich Six, who had already built a small blockhouse there, a few miles north of present-day Bethel Township, on the Shamokin Road leading to Fort Augusta.

=== Construction ===
1770 map of Pennsylvania showing Fort Henry in the center of the right lower quadrant, just right of the Berks County line.

In December, construction began on several forts intended to protect the civilian population: Fort Lebanon and its outpost Fort Northkill, Fort Swatara (a pre-existing fortified homestead), and its outpost Fort Manada, which was a blockhouse built by a local farmer. In January 1756, Pennsylvania infantry was sent to garrison these posts, and on January 25, Captain Christian Busse, with a company of 50 soldiers, was ordered by Governor Morris "to proceed to the Gap at Tolihaio, and there to erect a stoccado [stockade] fort...and range the woods from that fort westward towards Swehataro [Swatara] and eastwards towards...Fort Lebanon." The forts were located close enough to each other that a patrol could travel within a day to the next fort. On February 1 1756, Governor Morris wrote to Governor Robert Dinwiddie explaining his plan to construct a chain of forts, noting that "the most considerable of them is built at an important pass through the Kittahteny Hills, on our Northern Frontier, and I have called it Fort Henry." The origin of the name is unclear, but it may refer to Prince William Henry, Duke of Gloucester and Edinburgh, a younger brother of King George III.

No detailed description of the fort exists, and the only reference to its appearance comes from Major William Parsons, who visited the fort on May 29, 1756, reporting to Governor Morris:

"I went to Fort Henry, where were Capt. Christian Busse, his Lieut. Saml Weiser & Ensign Jacob Kern. This Fort is very well built, the Pallisades are Spiked together at the Top, the Houses within are all covered with Tyle and the whole is kept clean and in very good order. There is convenient Room within the Fort to parade and exercise all the Men."

The reference to houses covered with tile is significant, as frontier forts rarely used building materials aside from wood and stone. The use of tile may have been intended to prevent the buildings from being easily set on fire.

=== Garrison ===
On July 9 1756, Colonel Weiser wrote to Captain Busse ordering the distribution of troops to local farms, to protect men working in the fields at harvest time. Thirty-seven men were sent out to the farms, and nineteen were to remain at the fort, for a total of fifty-six. Because soldiers were frequently detached from the garrison to temporary duty elsewhere, Weiser decided to station a contingent of nine men and a sergeant to remain permanently at Fort Henry. A garrison roster from August-September 1756 lists a total of 53 men, including officers.

Regular calls for detachments to reinforce other forts frequently left Fort Henry with a reduced garrison. In October 1756, and February and April 1757, detachments of eighteen men and an officer were sent temporarily to Fort Augusta and other locations. The reduced garrison was not able to patrol as frequently between the forts or to mount much of a response to Native American attacks. In May 1757, men were again transferred from several forts to reinforce Fort Augusta, which the French were reportedly preparing to assault. After complaints from Colonel Weiser and Captain Busse, Deputy Governor William Denny considered relaxing the three-year term of enlistment and creating a three-month enlistment to allow local citizens to join as militia, under locally appointed officers, which would bolster the garrisons. On June 30, Governor Denny visited Fort Henry to announce this new plan:

"Intending to go to Fort Henry...I desired Col. Weiser to acquaint the Leaders of these infatuated People, that I shou'd be glad they would come and speak with me at the Fort. Accordingly, above Fifty substantial Freeholders, well mounted and armed, joined the Escort, & attended me to Fort Henry, where...they presented me a very respectful Address, assuring me of their Desire to have a proper Militia Law, and that they were determined under such a Law to serve and do their duty to their King and Country. Forty instantly were inlisted by Colonel Weiser out of this Neighbourhood, and a Magistrate about twenty Miles off wrote me he had inlisted forty more."

A total of 159 men enlisted for three months, but when the three-month term of service expired in September, the men returned to their farms, leaving the garrisons again undermanned. Colonel Weiser wrote angrily to Governor Denny:

"It is true, one hundred and fifty nine men were rased by your Honours order for three months, to replace those that were gone to Fort Augusta, but these mens time has been out for Some weeks and they are gone off having met with no further encouragement...How is it possible for to garrison Fort Henry with 30, The fort on Suartaro with 30 and Hunters Fort with 100 men and also to Send out strong ranging parties between Said forts?"

There was significant movement of troops in early 1758. On February 5, Lieutenant Jacob Kern reported a garrison of 89 men at Fort Henry, but on February 9, Commissary General James Young reported 105. On February 22, Colonel James Burd wrote: "Had a Review this morning at 9 AM found 90 soldiers under good Command & fine fellows...This is a very good stockaded Fort & every thing in good order & duty done pritty well." When Major Thomas Loyd took command of the eastern line of defense in April 1758, the garrison was reduced to 45 men, and by July to 25. All but 17 of these were sent to join the Forbes Expedition in November.

=== Military history ===
The fort was never attacked, but on July 11 1756, Colonel Weiser reported to Governor Morris that his son, Lieutenant Samuel Weiser, had told him that troops from Fort Henry had exchanged fire with a Native American war party at Caghuekacheeky. Twelve soldiers and six warriors were killed. According to the lieutenant, "our people kept the field and scalped the Indians, and...the Indians ran off without any scalp." The date and exact location of this battle were not reported.

On October 12 1757, a French officer appeared at the fort asking to surrender. He was questioned at Colonel Weiser's home and again at Reading. The soldier identified himself as Enseigne en second Michel Joseph Maray de La Chauvignerie, 15-year-old son of Michel Maray de La Chauvignerie, commander of Fort Machault. He had gone out 12 days earlier with a raiding party of seven Native American warriors and another Frenchman but after five days had become separated from them, and had lost his way. He wandered in the forest for a week before reaching Fort Henry. He was detained in Philadelphia and released in a prisoner exchange in 1759.

Native American war parties continued to attack local farms, killing two or three people at a time and taking children. In October 1758, the Pennsylvania Gazette printed an extract from a letter sent from Fort Henry:

"The First of October the Indians burnt a House on Swetara, killed one Man, and three are missing. Two Boys were found tied to a Tree, and Released. We are alarmed in the Fort almost every Night by a terrible Barking of Dogs; there are certainly some Indians about us; they hollow on the Mountain."

=== Abandonment ===
Captain Busse resigned in May 1759 and the fort was apparently abandoned after that. It served briefly as a patrol station in 1763-1764 during Pontiac's War, and was then permanently abandoned. Stone and wood from the fort were removed by farmers to be repurposed, but as late as 1882 remnants of the walls and the cellar of the gunpowder magazine were still visible.

== Memorialization ==
A stone monument was placed close to the fort's location in 1915 by the Historical Society of Berks County. Its inscription reads: "1756 FORT HENRY 25 yards north of this stone. French and Indian War." A historical marker was placed about a mile south of the fort's site by the Pennsylvania Historical Commission in 1959.
