= Fort Northkill =

18th century fort in colonial Pennsylvania

- Berks County, Pennsylvania (near Shartlesville, Pennsylvania)

Site information
- Type: Military fort

Location
- Location of Fort Northkill in Pennsylvania
- Coordinates: 40°30′46″N 76°06′16″W

Site history
- Built: 1756
- In use: 1756-1757
- Battles/wars: French and Indian War

Garrison information
- Past commanders: Captain Jacob Morgan; Sergeant John Popekins; Lieutenant Samuel Humphreys; Ensign Daniel Harry; Ensign Edward Biddle
- Garrison: 13-40 men plus officers

Fort Northkill was a fort in colonial Pennsylvania, built to protect settlers from attacks by French-allied Native Americans during the French and Indian War. Although the fort was garrisoned by Pennsylvania militia, they were unable to prevent continued attacks on local farmsteads, but the fort did provide some protection for the settlers themselves. The fort appears to have been abandoned in September 1757, but the exact date is unknown.

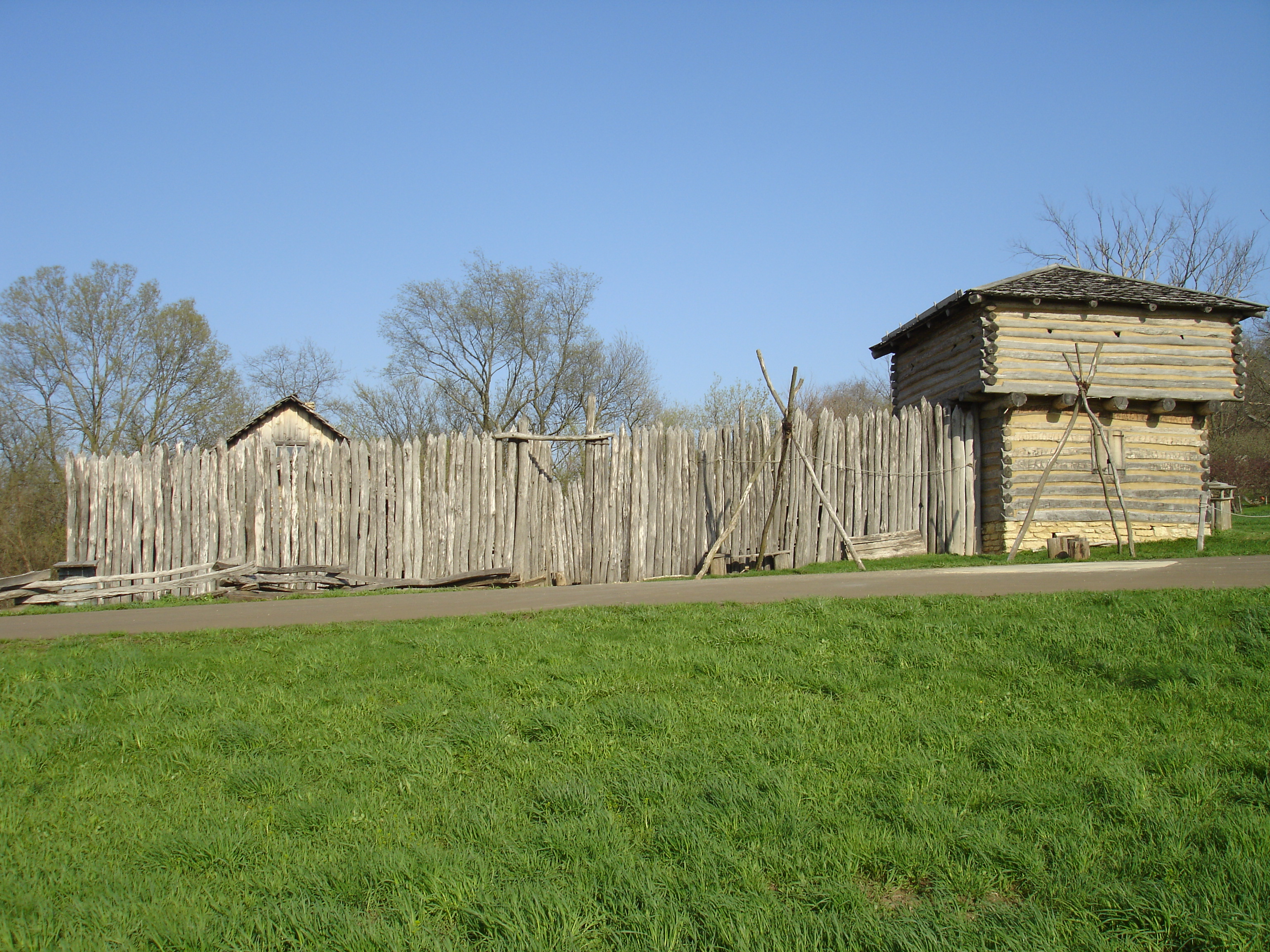
Reconstructed stockade and blockhouse similar to the original Fort Northkill.

== History ==
At the beginning of the French and Indian War, Braddock's defeat left Pennsylvania without a professional military force. Lenape chiefs Shingas and Captain Jacobs launched dozens of Shawnee and Delaware raids against British colonial settlements, killing and capturing hundreds of colonists and destroying settlements across western and central Pennsylvania. In late 1755, Colonel John Armstrong wrote to Governor Robert Hunter Morris: "I am of the opinion that no other means of defense than a chain of blockhouses along or near the south side of the Kittatinny Mountains from the Susquehanna to the temporary line, can secure the lives and property of the inhabitants of this country."

=== Construction ===
On January 25 1756, Captain Jacob Morgan, then in command of Fort Lebanon, was ordered to leave 20 men at his fort and with the remaining 30 proceed "to some convenient place about halfway between that fort and [Fort Henry] at Tolihaio, and there to erect a stoccado (stockade) of about 400 foot square, where he is to leave 20 men under a commissioned officer and to return to Fort Lebanon, which he is to make his headquarters." On April 3, Captain Christian Busse wrote from Fort Henry to Lieutenant Colonel Conrad Weiser that "On Wednesday [March 31] I scouted with a detachment to the place near Long's where the new fort is to be built." Construction was completed in April. The fort was situated halfway between Fort Lebanon and Fort Henry, near present-day Shartlesville, Pennsylvania.

Commissary General James Young inspected the fort on June 20, 1756, and reported that it was considerably smaller than specified in Captain Morgan's orders:

[The fort] is about 19 miles from Reading...and stands in a very thick wood, on a small rising ground, half a mile from the middle Northkill Creek; it is intended for a square about 32 feet each way, at each corner is a half bastion, of very little service to flank the curtains, the stoccades (pointed stakes) are very ill-fixed in the ground and open in many places; within is a very bad log house for the people, it has no chimney, and can afford but little shelter in bad weather...The woods are not cleared above 40 yards from the fort; I gave order to cut down for 200 yards."

The fort was reportedly built on slightly elevated ground, which gave it a full view of the cultivated valley lying all around it, and a source of water from a spring was close by. At the time it was built, the surrounding land was cultivated almost up to the fort's walls.

=== Military history ===
On November 3, 1756, the garrison received word that a war party had kidnapped a child from a nearby farm, and the fort's commander, Lieutenant Samuel Humphreys, took some soldiers and went in search of them. Humphreys assigned twenty local farmers to guard the fort. Finding nothing, the soldiers returned, and the following day they were alerted by the sound of gunfire. The fort's commander, along with seven soldiers and seventeen of the farmers, found twenty Native American warriors attacking a local farm. The warriors opened fire, at which point the farmers fled, but Lieutenant Humphreys and his men stood their ground and returned fire until the Indians retreated. The troops rescued ten women and children from the burning house, in which the bodies of two settlers were also found. One soldier and two of the warriors were wounded, and no one was killed. Captain Morgan wrote to Deputy Governor William Denny, stating: "Mr. Humphreys behaved in a most laudable manner, and manifested that calm courage and presence of mind which will ever gain an advantage over superior numbers." In a separate letter to the governor, he expressed distress over his small garrison, from which men had recently been transferred to Fort Augusta: "That having two Forts belonging to one Company, and my Men to the Number of 19 was drafted from me, being total but Fifty-Three, Your Petitioner thinks himself too weak to be of any Service to the Frontiers, seeing the Enemy commits violent Outrages nigh the Forts."

The diary of an unnamed officer at Fort Northkill, believed to have been Captain Lieutenant Samuel Weiser (son of Colonel Conrad Weiser), describes events at the fort from June 13 through September 1, 1757. He reports that on June 29, another farm was attacked and the farmer (Fred Myers) and his wife were both killed and scalped. Four children between the ages of 6 and 10 were taken captive, and two younger children were found alive, one of whom had been scalped. Troops from the fort pursued the Indians but did not find them.

Crowding at the fort made life there difficult for the garrison, and many soldiers were billetted at local farms. This also created some tension with the settlers, who had small homes and felt exploited. On June 24 Captain Busse wrote that "The people are not at all pleased that some 40 men are kept at the Fort at Northkill, since only 20 can stay at the fort and the others at Lang's and Kanter's." On August 17 Colonel Conrad Weiser arrived with the news that he had decided to rebuild the fort at another site nearby, and ordered that the land be cleared. This was nearly completed when Weiser's diary ends on September 1 1757, but evidently the new fort was never built.

The garrison may have been transferred to another fort in early September. On September 19, the Hochstetler farm at the Northkill Amish Settlement was attacked and burned, and there is no record of a response from the fort. Records also show that Frederick Degler and his family took refuge in the fort in September, and were still there at the time of the Bloody Springs massacre on October 1. On that day, the farms of the Spatz family and the Degler family were destroyed, and six members of the Spatz family were killed. Forty soldiers and two lieutenants from the Royal American Regiment were sent from Reading to protect the other farms, which would not have been necessary had there been a garrison at Fort Northkill.

=== Abandonment, 1757 ===
On September 27, Governor Denny ordered Fort Northkill to be abandoned, writing:

"I observe what You say of the Blockhouse, or Fort, on Northkill, that it is badly situated, in very bad order, and will not afford dry Quarters for the Men, and that about half Mile from it, at Jacob Kantings Plantation, is a very suitable Spot for another Blockhouse. As to building a new Fort or Blockhouse, the Commissioners having refused to discharge the Sums due the Workmen for building Fort Loudoun...I do not incline to give them any more Trouble of this Sort."

The governor recommended that a new fort be built by "Country People at their own Expense...with the Assistance of the Soldiers," but as the war was turning in favor of the British, the idea was abandoned.

By early 1758, the fort had fallen into ruins. On March 15, 1758, the residents in and around Bern petitioned the governor for "soldiers to be stationed for their defense in some of the most exposed farm houses," because "the blockhouse at Northkill is destroyed and no garrison kept in those parts." The remains of the fort were still visible in the early 1800s, but by 1879 only the cellar, which was probably the remains of the gunpowder magazine, still existed.
