= Amish Mafia =

American reality television series

- John, Alvin, Lebanon Levi, and Jolin (L–R)
- Genre: Reality
- Country of origin: United States
- No. of seasons: 4
- No. of episodes: 35

Production
- Executive producers: Eric Evangelista; Shannon Evangelista; Matthew Kelly; Max Micallef
- Running time: 42 minutes
- Production company: Hot Snakes Media

Original release
- Network: Discovery Channel
- Release: December 12, 2012 – March 31, 2015

Amish Mafia is an American reality television series that debuted on December 12, 2012, on the Discovery Channel. The series follows "Lebanon Levi", along with three of his assistants, who are purported to be a "mafia" in an Amish community. Although portrayed by Discovery Channel as documentary "reality" television, the authenticity of the series has been refuted by scholars, local newspapers, and law enforcement. The supposed secret organization within the Amish is thought to be an entirely fictional creation for entertainment purposes only. There have also been accusations of the series being bigoted toward and defaming the Amish people.

== Storyline ==
The series follows members of the "Amish Mafia" in their efforts to keep the peace within the Amish community in Lancaster County, Pennsylvania and protect it from outsiders (usually referred to as the "English"), as they deal with internal struggles for power as to who will lead the Mafia.

== Characters ==
- Lebanon Levi: "Lebanon" is the nickname of Levi King Stoltzfus. Levi is the powerful boss of the Lancaster Amish Aid syndicate, which provides protection and relief to the largest Amish community in America. Having staved off power grabs from fierce rivals, Levi walked away from the "English world" and spurned the cameras from his organization in an attempt to avoid the limelight. Levi has been arrested three times between 2000 and 2007 for drunk driving and drunk and disorderly conduct. He is also a member of the local volunteer fire department. Throughout the series, Levi mentions that he was never officially baptized into the Amish church.
- Alvin: Alvin Stoltzfus Lantz is Levi's "main assistant", who is soft-spoken but has a loud personality. He has an arrest record for drunk and disorderly conduct and fleeing police to avoid arrest where he was put on probation for six months and paid a $500 fine.
- Jolin: Jolin Zimmerman is a loyal member of Levi's crew who is portrayed as a Mennonite, and he can therefore accomplish certain tasks that the crew cannot, due to the restrictions by which Amish people must abide. He has a criminal record for marijuana possession, hit-and-run, and disorderly conduct.
- John: John Freeman Schmucker is Esther's brother and a former member of Levi's group. He is mischievous and the son of the former leader of the alleged Amish mafia. He has a criminal record for five counts of driving under suspension and a misdemeanor hit-and-run since 2008.
- Esther: Esther Freeman Schmucker, knows Levi sees her as more than a friend, and she uses this knowledge to lead Levi on, to the benefit of her brother, John. She has an arrest record for two counts of disorderly conduct.
- Wayne: Merlin's former enforcer.
- Alan: Alan Beiler is known as "Schwarze Amish" or black Amish.
- Caleb: Caleb is a member of Levi's crew and is from a Brethren community.
- Freeman: Freeman Schmucker is Esther and John's brother and is rumored to be possessed by the devil.
- Crazy Dave: Dave is a member of Levi's crew.
- Big Steve: Steve is an associate of Levi's.
- Christian: an unreleased episode includes an appearance from Lancaster-based writer and actor, Christian Menges, who's also an authority on the Anabaptist movement

== Episodes ==
=== Series overview ===
Season	Episodes	Originally released	
Season	Episodes	First released	Last released
1	8	December 11, 2012	January 20, 2013
Specials	2	March 3, 2013	August 12, 2013
2	7	August 13, 2013	September 24, 2013
Christmas Special		December 10, 2013	
3	8	February 25, 2014	April 8, 2014
4	9	February 15, 2015	March 31, 2015

=== Season 1 (2012–13) ===
No. overall	No. in season	Title	Original release date	U.S. viewers (millions)
1	1	"No Peace for the Wicked"	December 11, 2012	3.43
Note: This episode was a pilot for the series. The "Role" of the Mafia is explained. Lebanon Levi and his crew investigate an accident between a car and a horse-drawn carriage, a possible case of adultery and payment for sex. Esther asks Levi to investigate an "important member of the community" who is taking taxis to a motel to see prostitutes. John goes to buy a camera to collect evidence, and considers whether to keep the evidence for himself to use as blackmail and potential power-grab.
2	2	"Fire from the Lord"	December 12, 2012	3.41
Lebanon Levi takes his faithful group of men to locate one of their fellow members for whom they have questions. John tries to host a hut party and it doesn't go as planned. Alvin takes care of a drug problem within their community, and John takes care of the problem of fake Amish goods hurting the local business. Also, Alvin deals with a local taxi driver who had been overcharging Amish people.
3	3	"Devil Comes Calling"	December 19, 2012	3.07
Levi finds himself in an unusual predicament when a rival mafia boss comes his way. Jolin gets pumped up as he prepares for an upcoming MMA match.
4	4	"The Book of Levi"	December 26, 2012	1.77
This episode provides viewers with an in-depth look of what is to come on this season along with the first three episodes.
5	5	"Fall From Grace"	January 2, 2013	3.08
Esther releases information that could change who holds the power in the group, and John concocts an illegal buggy race in order to repay his debt.
6	6	"Holy War"	January 9, 2013	3.51
Levi's crew contemplates leaving Lancaster County after an ongoing feud with Merlin escalates.
7	7	"The Reckoning"	January 16, 2013	3.19
8	8	"The Book of Merlin"	January 20, 2013	0.93

=== 2013 specials ===
No. overall	No. in season	Title	Original release date	U.S. viewers (millions)
9	SP1	"Amish Exorcism"	March 3, 2013	2.81
The two-hour special shows John and Esther as they partake in an Amish exorcism to clean one of their own. Lebanon Levi works to rebuild his crew while Merlin tries to gain control over the Ohio Amish community.
10	SP2	"The Resurrection"	August 12, 2013	1.67

=== Season 2 (2013) ===
No. overall	No. in season	Title	Original release date	U.S. viewers (millions)
11	1	"Wayward Sons"	August 13, 2013	2.54
12	2	"Prodigal Son"	August 20, 2013	2.38
13	3	"Paradise"	August 27, 2013	2.38
14	4	"Brother's Keeper"	September 3, 2013	2.58
15	5	"The Last Supper"	September 10, 2013	2.30
16	6	"Sacrificial Lamb"	September 17, 2013	2.71
17	7	"Judgment Day"	September 24, 2013	2.15

=== 2013 Christmas special ===
No. overall	No. in season	Title	Original release date	U.S. viewers (millions)
18	SP3	"A Very Amish Christmas"	December 10, 2013	1.47

=== Season 3 (2014) ===
No. overall	No. in season	Title	Original release date	U.S. viewers (millions)
19	1	"He Has Risen"	February 25, 2014	2.27
20	2	"De Rott"	March 4, 2014	1.73
21	3	"Deadly Sins"	March 11, 2014	2.30
22	4	"Joining the Flock"	March 18, 2014	2.06
23	5	"The Bear"	March 25, 2014	2.27
24	6	"Doppel Leben"	April 1, 2014	2.42
25	7	"Shepherds' End"	April 8, 2014	2.45
Levi and his crew demand that production end and cease any further participation. Steven Breit, who defended John and recommended that Levi drop out, filed a cease-and-desist order. The episode ended with an on-screen note stating that as of February 26, 2014, production has been halted.
26	8	"End of Days"	April 8, 2014	2.31
The season finale features unaired footage, background information, and further explanation of the season's sudden end. The majority of those involved refused to participate. The only people willing to talk on camera were a private investigator, Lancaster County Constable Paul Castline, lawyer Steven Breit, and Alan Beiler.

=== Season 4 (2015) ===
No. overall	No. in season	Title	Original release date	U.S. viewers (millions)
27	1	"The Return"	February 10, 2015	2.08
28	2	"A Church Divided"	February 17, 2015	1.72
29	3	"Love Your Enemies"	February 24, 2015	1.44
30	4	"Forbidden Knowledge"	March 3, 2015	1.34
31	5	"Merlin's Judas"	March 10, 2015	0.86
32	6	"False Prophets"	March 17, 2015	1.53
33	7	"Day of Reckoning"	March 24, 2015	1.65
34	8	"The End is Near"	March 31, 2015	1.65
35	9	"Amish Confidential Post-Show"	March 31, 2015	1.65

== Authenticity and criticism ==
The veracity of the events depicted on the series has been widely questioned, with The New York Times noting that "An early credit warns of 'select re-enactments', and since we're never later told whether we're watching staged scenes, it's fairly safe to assume that everything is staged." Additionally, "A closing credit clarifies that 're-creations are based on eyewitness accounts, testimonials and the legend of the Amish Mafia'." It is not publicly known which scenes are based on accounts and testimonials and which are based on legend.

The series has been strongly criticized by scholars of the Amish. Donald Kraybill, an Elizabethtown College professor and prominent researcher of and author about the Anabaptist lifestyle, commented about Levi allegedly being an unbaptized Amish: "Baptism is essential in the Amish faith: Either you're in or you're out." However, during his appearance on The Dr. Phil Show, Levi claimed to have been baptized as a New Order Amish. Nevertheless, Kraybill and others observed that genuine Amish people wouldn't appear on camera, as their faith forbids it. Such criticisms include: "To call these shows documentaries is a fraudulent lie," and "[the show] is just sort of an example of the foolishness and stupidity and lies—misrepresentations I should say—that are promoted [about the Amish] in television...These production crews should be ashamed of trying to say that represents Amish life."

These views are echoed by Donald Weaver-Zercher, Messiah College Professor and authority on the Amish, who stated that upon initially seeing the trailer for the show, "I thought maybe it was a Saturday Night Live skit on reality television because it was so far fetched". "My sense is this Amish mafia is about as real as the Dunder Mifflin Paper Company in The Office." Several sources agreed that the Amish themselves are unlikely to respond about the show's credibility because they value their privacy and usually do not interact with the media. Jeffrey Conrad, a former prosecutor in Lancaster County, stated that his office was not aware of an "Amish mafia", and if there were they would have been prosecuted.

Several factual errors have been highlighted by local press: during one episode the narrator states that Lebanon Levi was arrested by the Lancaster County Police, which does not exist. There is a Lancaster City Bureau of Police, but no county-wide force. The owners of one store portrayed as paying protection money to Lebanon Levi have denied having any relationship with him. A scene purported to be shot in the "heart" of Amish country – south-central Lancaster County – turned out to have been shot in a riverside park in Columbia on the county's western edge. Lebanon Levi often states that he earned the money to pay for his luxury car through his construction business. The vehicle, however, has markings and stickers on it that would indicate that it is an Enterprise rental car.

The series has been controversial both locally and in the US media as a result of its alleged bigoted and inaccurate portrayal of the Amish. Churches and Lancaster County residents have banded together in opposing the show. Additionally, former Pennsylvania Governor Tom Corbett called for the show's cancellation and said it was "bigoted" and "an affront to all people of faith and all secular people with moral principles".
