= Roadside America =

Pennsylvania indoor miniature village (1935–2020)

Coordinates: 40.51285°N 76.12134°W

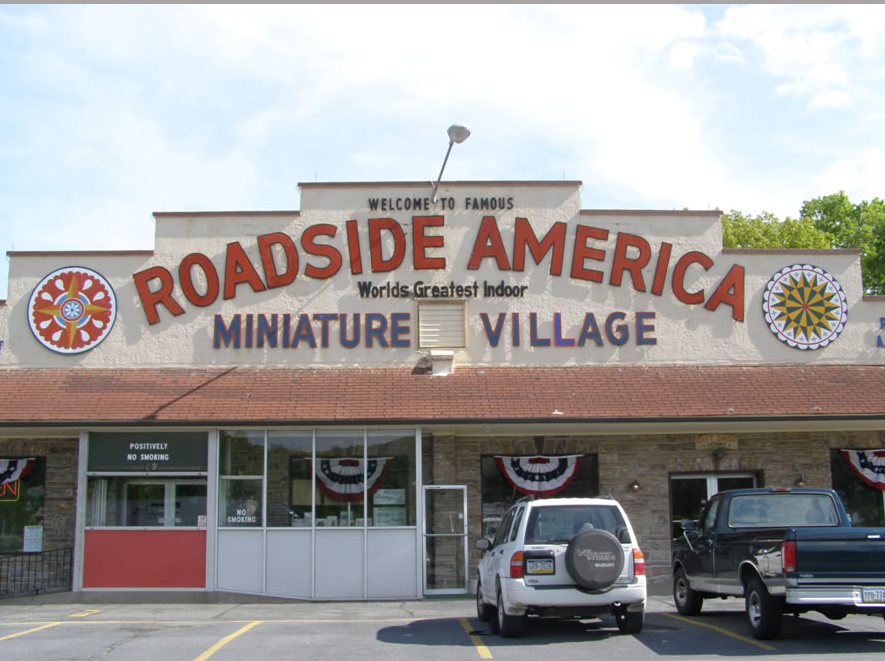
- The entrance in 2009
- Established: 1935
- Dissolved: 2020
- Location: Shartlesville, Pennsylvania
- Collection size: Railroad model trains and other model structures

Roadside America was an indoor miniature village and railway covering 8,000 square feet (740 m^{2}). Created by Laurence Gieringer in 1935, it was first displayed to the public in his Hamburg, Pennsylvania, home. The miniature village's popularity increased after stories were published about it in local newspapers, which prompted Gieringer to move it to a recently closed local amusement park called Carsonia Park. This location, which supported more visitors, was open from 1938 to about 1940. To accommodate growing interest and build a larger display, Geringer then purchased land at what would be the miniature village's final location, a former dance hall in Shartlesville, Pennsylvania off of Interstate 78, approximately 20 mi (32 km) west of the Lehigh Valley, where the display reopened in 1953.

After being closed since March 2020 due to the COVID-19 pandemic, Roadside America announced on November 21, 2020, that they were closing permanently after trying, unsuccessfully, to find a buyer for the past three years, and that they would be auctioning off the display.

== The display ==
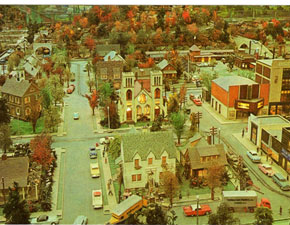
Interior View of Display

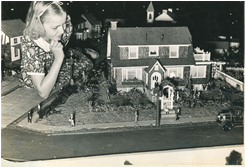
Geringer's granddaughter looking at a model house in the museum

The 3/8 inch to one foot scale display contains:

- A 7,450 square foot, fully landscaped village diorama displaying over 300 miniature structures
- Up to 18 O gauge trains, trolleys and cable cars running throughout the display
- 10,000 hand-made trees
- 4,000 miniature people engaged in everyday daily pursuits
- Many rivers, streams and waterways
- Interactive animations such as a circus parade, construction workers, saw mill workers and more that can be activated by visitors
- 600 miniature light bulbs

The display is constructed with:

- 21,500 feet of electrical wiring
- 17,700 board feet of lumber
- 6,000 feet of building paper
- 4,000 feet of sheet metal under the plaster work
- 2,250 feet of railroad track
- 648 feet of canvas for waterproofing
- 450 feet of pipe
- 18,000 pounds of plaster
- 4,000 pounds of sheet iron
- 900 pounds of nails
- 600 pounds of rubber roofing material
- 75 pounds of dry paint
- 75 gallons of liquid paint
- 225 bushels of moss
- 25 bags of cement
- Three barrels of screened sawdust
- Three barrels of tar

Roadside America remained unchanged after Gieringer's death in 1963.
