= Seyfert Mill =

- U.S. National Register of Historic Places
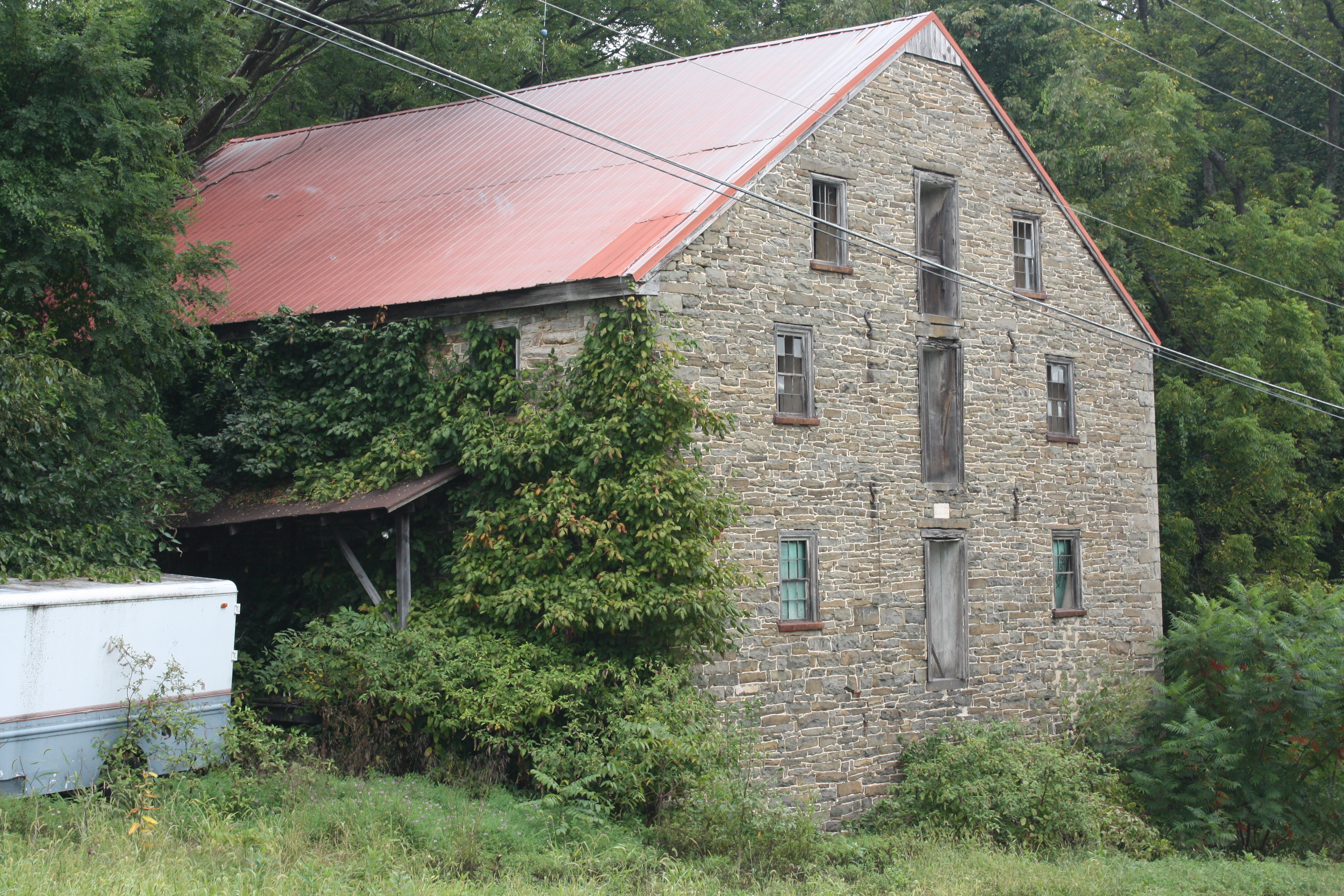
- Seyfert Mill. September 2013.

- Location within Pennsylvania Location within the United States
- Location: Junction of Old U.S. Route 22 and Campsite Road, Upper Tulpehocken Township, Pennsylvania
- Coordinates: 40°30′35″N 76°07′34″W
- Area: 3 acres (1.2 ha)
- Built: 1840
- MPS: Gristmills in Berks County MPS
- NRHP reference No.: 90001629
- Added to NRHP: November 8, 1990

Seyfert Mill is a historic grist mill located in Upper Tulpehocken Township, Berks County, Pennsylvania. The combined mill and house building was built in 1840, and is a 2 1/2-story, with basement, banked stone building. It measures 48 by 50 feet (15 by 15 m). Also on the property are the contributing millrace and pond. The mill ceased operation in about 1954.

It was listed on the National Register of Historic Places in 1990.

== Gallery ==
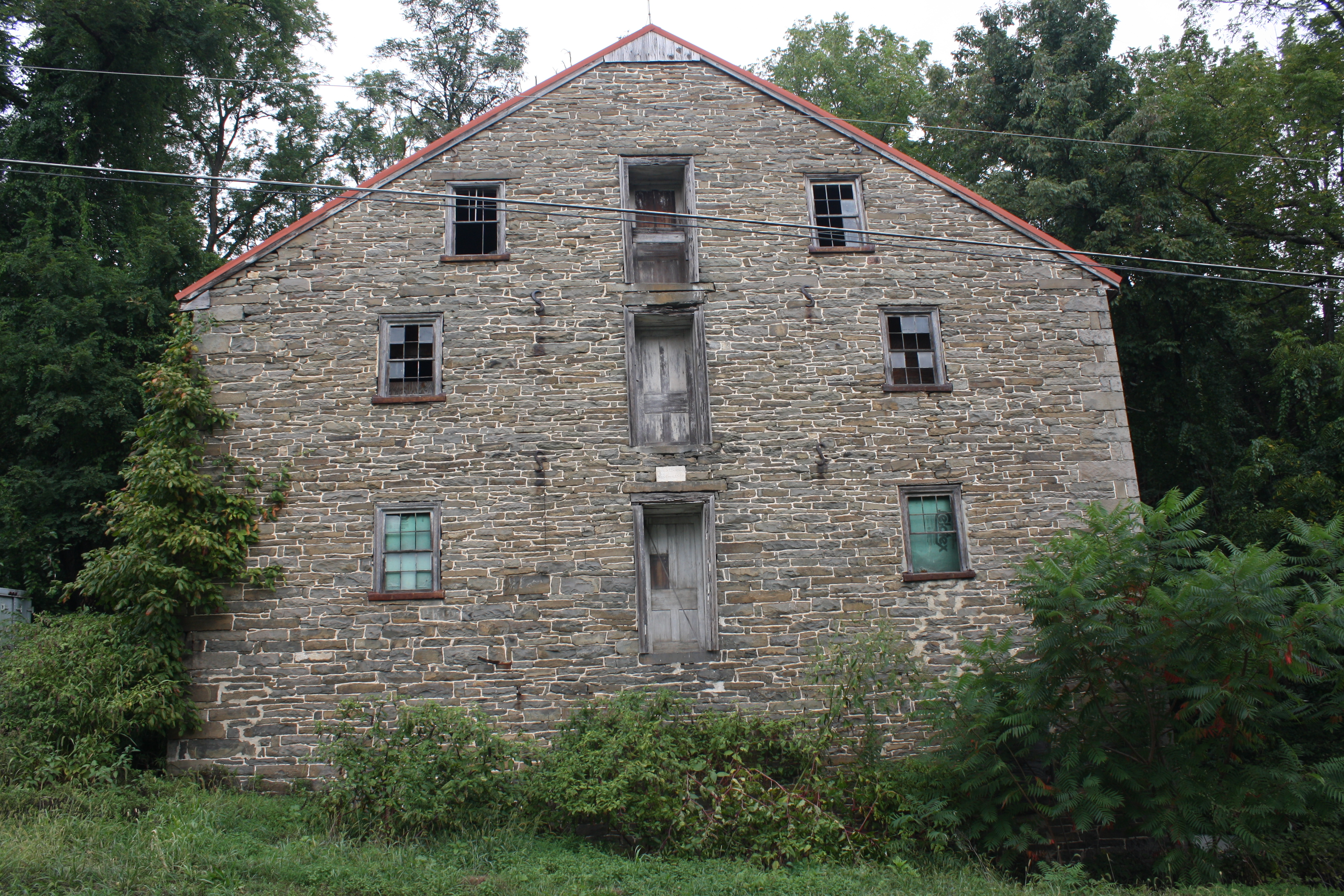
Seyfert Mill

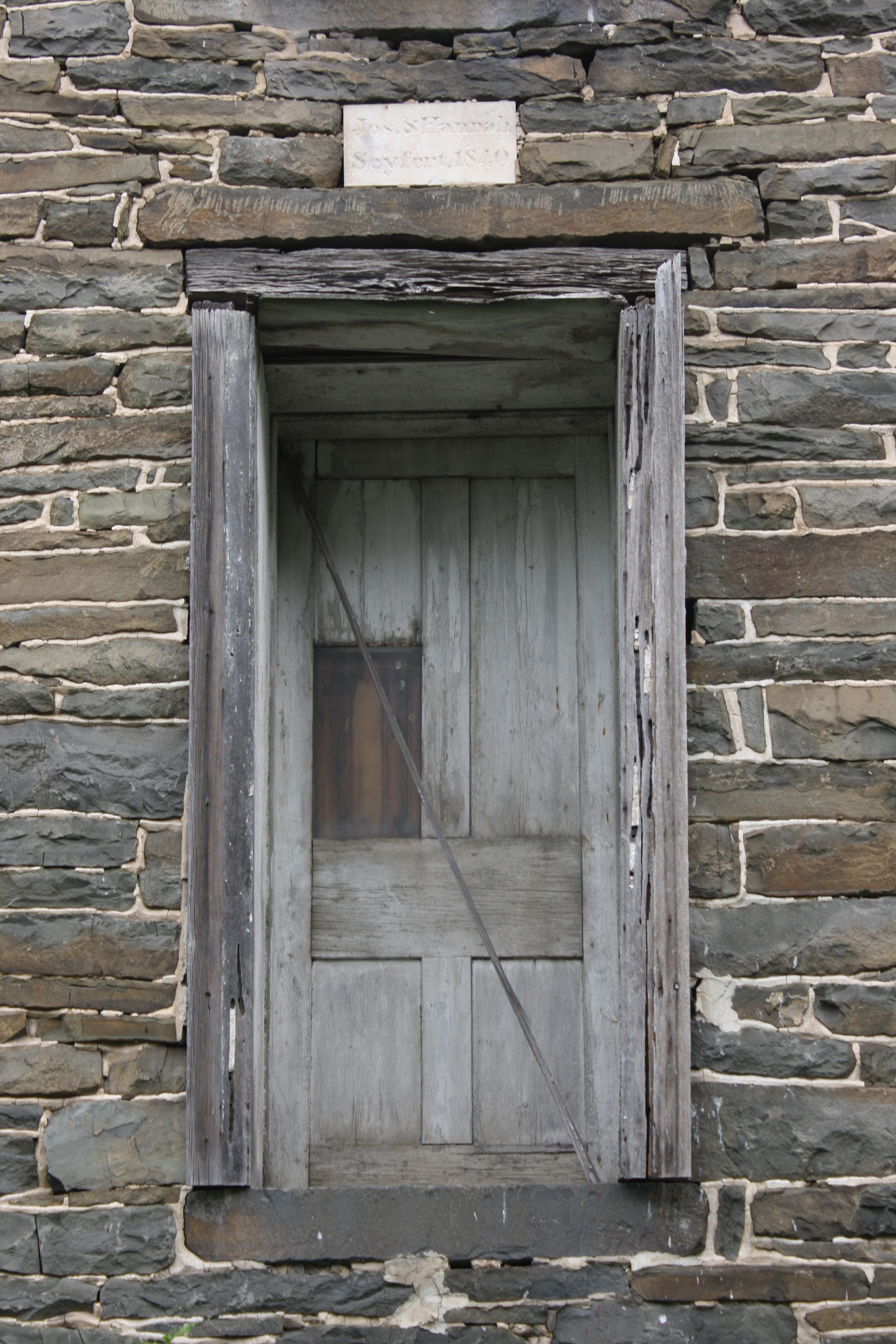
Dated stone 'Jos.&Hannah Seyfert, 1840"

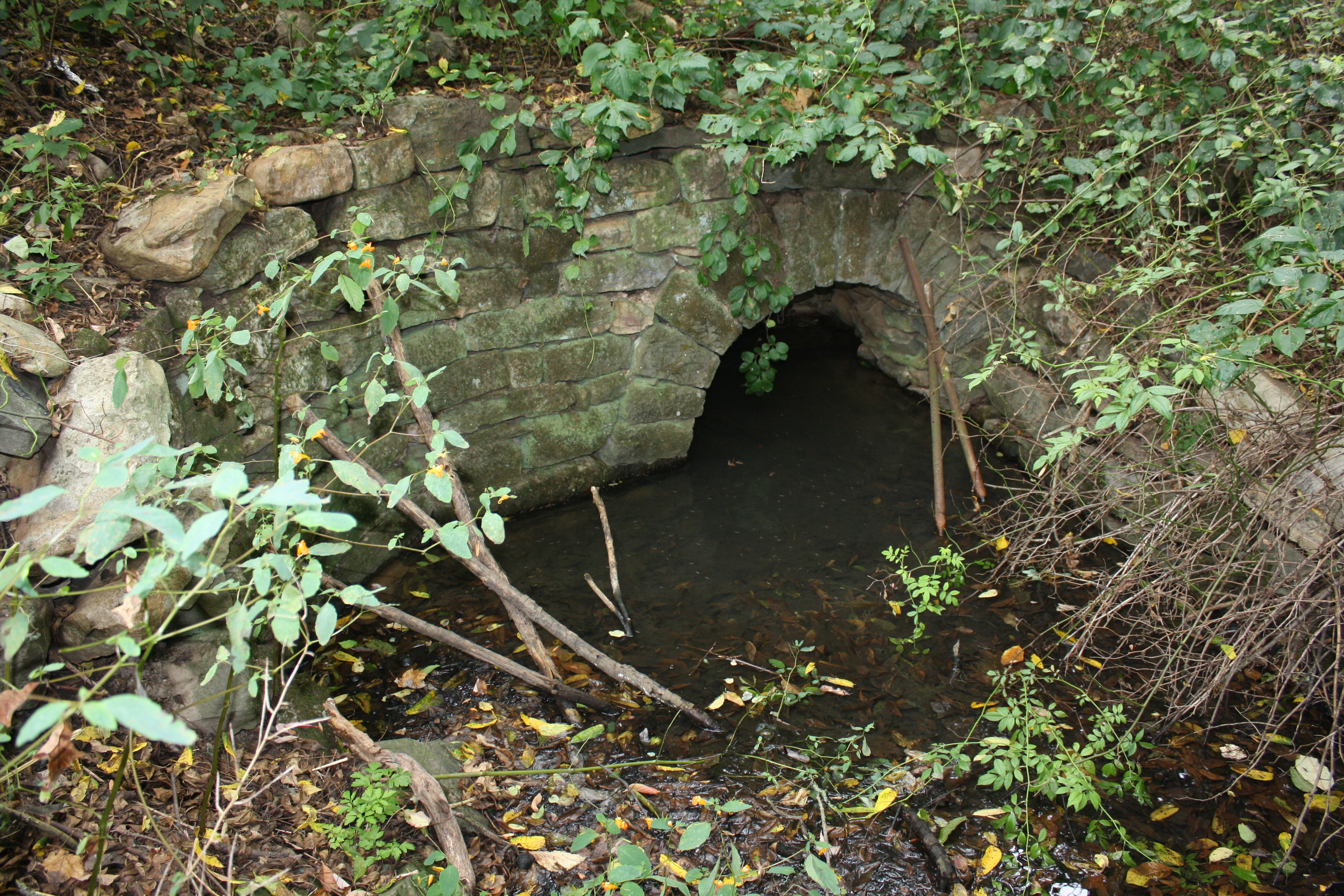
Millrace
