= Somerset Amish Settlement =

Coordinates: 39.79°N 79.08°W

The Somerset Amish Settlement, which is located in Somerset County, Pennsylvania, is the second oldest Amish settlement that still exists. It was founded in 1772 by Amish from the Northkill Amish Settlement in Berks County, Pennsylvania.

== History ==
The Northkill Amish Settlement, which was founded circa 1740, was the first Amish settlement in North America and remained the largest Amish settlement into the 1780s. It subsequently declined as families moved on to areas of better farmland, mainly to Lancaster County, Pennsylvania and Somerset County, Pennsylvania in Pennsylvania, where they formed the Lancaster Amish Settlement circa 1760 and the Somerset Amish Settlement in 1772.

The Amish from Somerset County became the "vanguard of Amish settlers in Midwest"; "out of and through it most Midwest Amish settlements were founded." This movement to either Lancaster or Somerset resulted in the first major divide in the family tree of the Amish. The two groups differ not only in dialect (Midwestern vs. Pennsylvania forms of Pennsylvania German) but also in the selection of typical Amish family names.

Today, it is home to only seven church districts. The Somerset Amish hold Sunday service at meetinghouses, instead of practicing home worship, as almost all other Old Order Amish do.
