= Shartlesville, Pennsylvania =

Unincorporated community in Pennsylvania, US

- Census-designated place
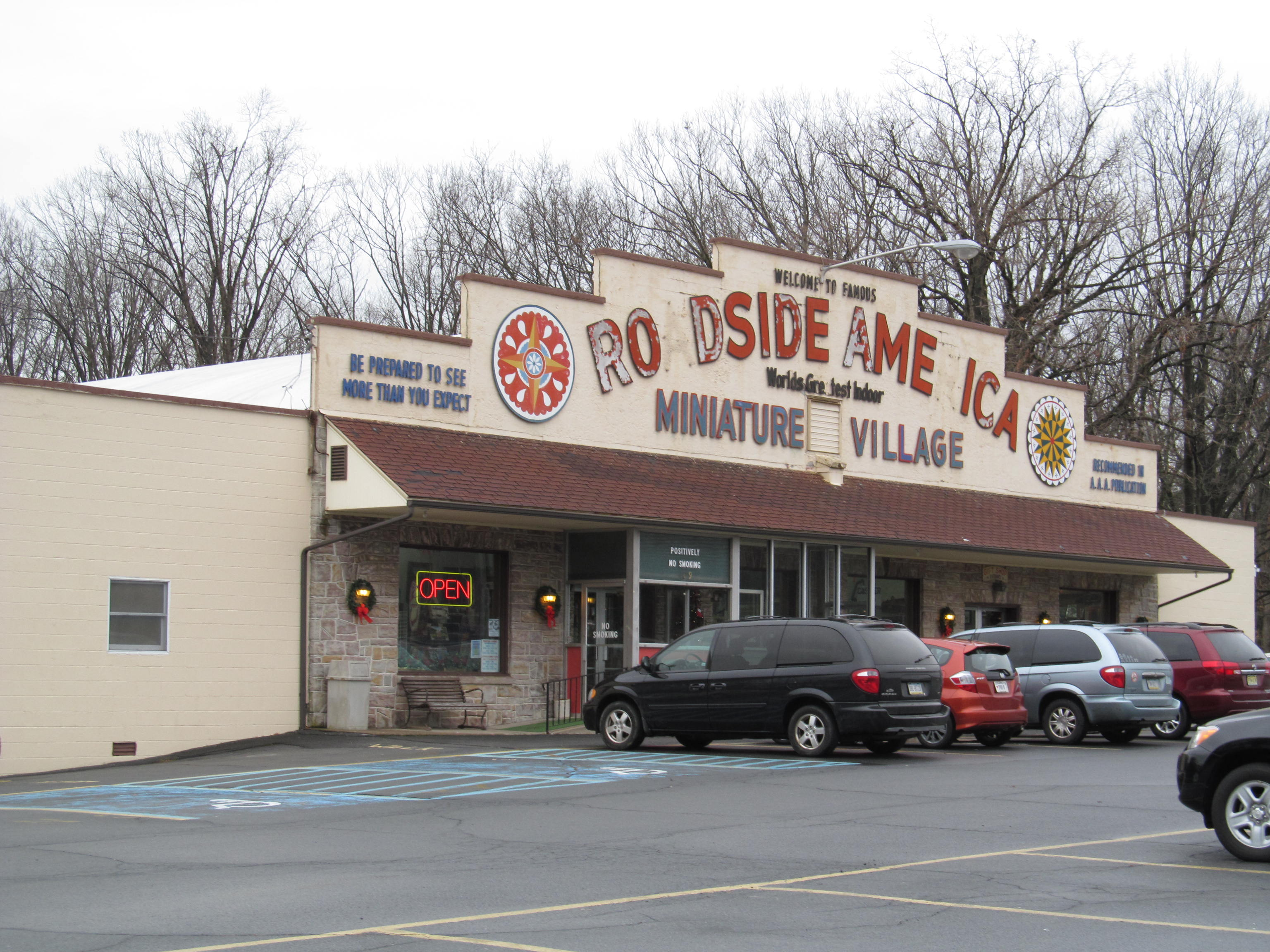
- Former Roadside America building

- Location within Pennsylvania Location within the United States
- Coordinates: 40°30′46″N 76°06′16″W
- Country: United States
- State: Pennsylvania
- County: Berks
- Township: Upper Bern
- Elevation: 568 ft (173 m)

Population (2010)
  - Total: 455
- Time zone: UTC-5 (Eastern (EST))
  - Summer (DST): UTC-4 (EDT)
- ZIP Code: 19554
- Area codes: 610 & 484
- GNIS feature ID: 1187386

Shartlesville is a census-designated place that is located in Upper Bern Township, Pennsylvania, United States. As of the 2010 census, the population was 455 residents.

== History ==
Shartlesville, which was founded in 1765, was named for the Shartle family of farmers and innkeepers, and particularly for Peter Shartle, a pioneer settler and colonel during the Revolutionary War.

== Geography ==
This American town is located just south of Interstate 78 on the south side of Blue Mountain. It is drained by Wolf Creek south into the Northkill Creek, a tributary of the Tulpehocken Creek.

The village has a box post office with the ZIP code of 19554, but outlying areas use the Bernville ZIP code of 19506 or the Hamburg ZIP code of 19526. It is served by the Hamburg Area School District.

== Notable features ==
It is home to the Shartlesville Hotel, which suffered major roof damage in February 2009 during a wind storm that also knocked down a billboard in Reading, Pennsylvania, and blew off roof tiles of the Pagoda in eastern Reading.

The community was also the home of Roadside America, a large community of miniature trains and villages, located off Interstate 78, that was open to the public at that location from 1953 until 2020, when the attraction was closed, largely due to the COVID-19 pandemic.

The community's proximity to Interstate 78 and availability of warehouse space makes it suitable for government investment. Just off Mountain Road, a half million square foot facility was purchased by ICE for detainment use for $87 million.

Just to the north of Shartlesville was the Mountain Springs Arena, which hosted events including rodeos, concerts, horse shows, demolition derbies, tractor pulls, and an annual country fair.

== Demographics ==
Historical population
Census	Pop.	Note	%±
2010	455		—
2020	404		−11.2%
2024 (est.)	387	▼	−4.2%
US Census

Race and Ethnicity
Racial and ethnic composition	2010	2020
White (non-Hispanic)	94.29%	90.35%
Hispanic or Latino (of any race)	5.05%	3.47%
Two or more races (non-Hispanic)	0.22%	2.97%
Black or African American (non-Hispanic)	0.0%	1.73%
Other (non-Hispanic)	0.22%	1.24%
Asian (non-Hispanic)	0.22%	0.25%
Native American (non-Hispanic)	0.0%	0.0%
Pacific Islander (non-Hispanic)	0.0%	0.0%

== See also ==
- Media related to Shartlesville, Pennsylvania at Wikimedia Commons
