= Strausstown, Pennsylvania =

Unincorporated community in Pennsylvania, US

- Unincorporated community & CDP
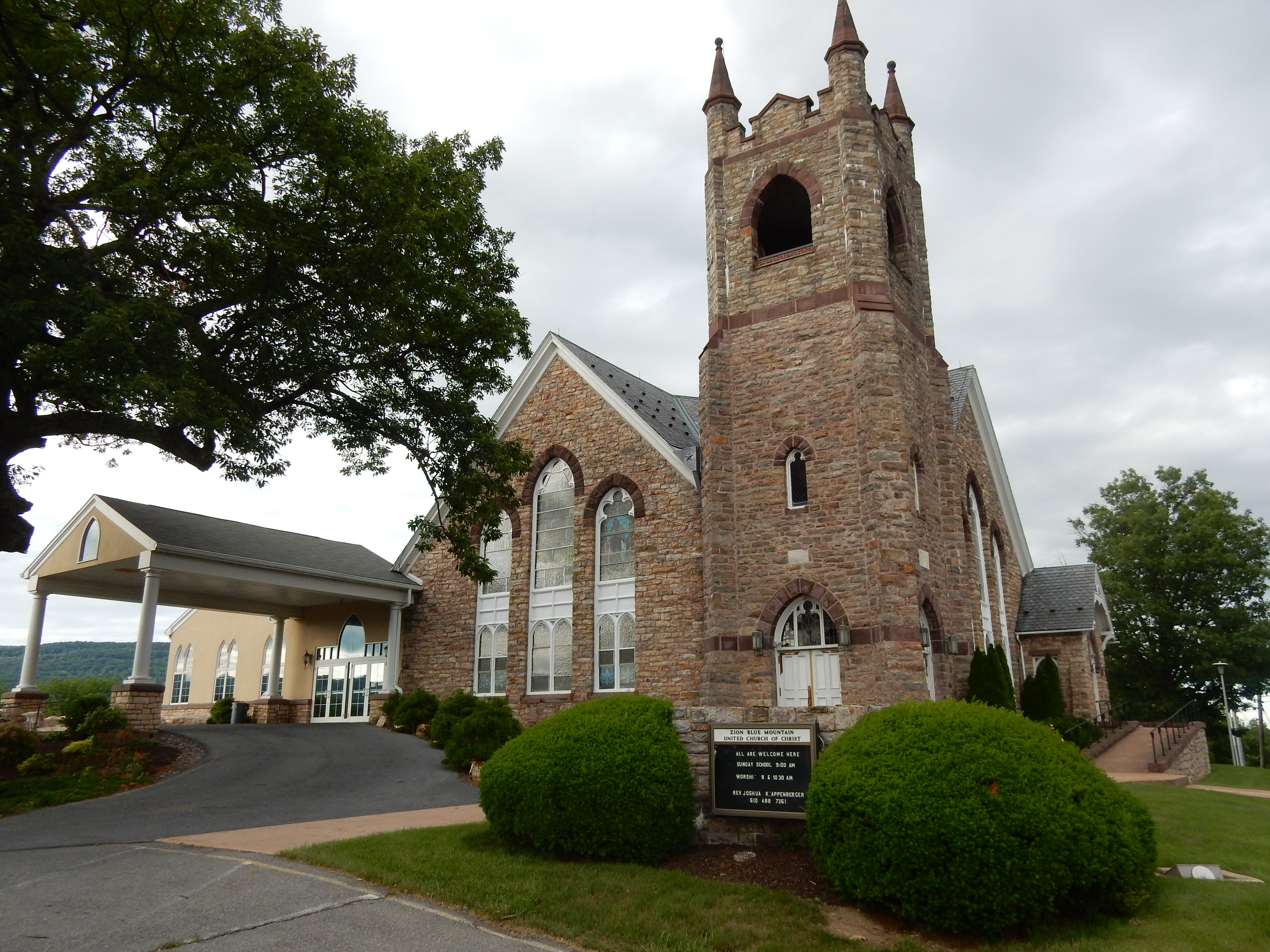
- Zion Blue Mountain Church in Strausstown

- Location of Strausstown in Berks County, Pennsylvania

- Location of Strausstown in Pennsylvania Strausstown (the United States)
- Coordinates: 40°29′31″N 76°11′03″W
- Country: United States
- State: Pennsylvania
- County: Berks
- Township: Upper Tulpehocken

Area
  - Total: 0.17 sq mi (0.43 km^{2})
  - Land: 0.16 sq mi (0.42 km^{2})
  - Water: 0 sq mi (0.00 km^{2})
- Elevation: 574 ft (175 m)

Population (2010)
  - Total: 342
  - Estimate (2016): 345
  - Density: 2,109/sq mi (814.2/km^{2})
- Time zone: UTC-5 (EST)
  - Summer (DST): UTC-4 (EDT)
- ZIP Code: 19559
- Area codes: 610 and 484
- FIPS code: 42-74744

Strausstown is a census-designated place and former borough located in Upper Tulpehocken Township, Pennsylvania. The population was 342 at the 2010 census.

== Geography and history ==
Strausstown is located at 40°29′31″N 76°11′3″W (40.492053, -76.184102). According to the U.S. Census Bureau, the village has a total area of 0.2 square mile (0.5 km^{2}), all land.

Strausstown was founded in 1840 by John Strauss. It is located at the source of several tributaries to Northkill Creek.

In 2016, the borough of Strausstown voted to merge with surrounding Upper Tulpehocken Township.

== Demographics ==
Historical population
Census	Pop.	Note	%±
1880	310		—
1930	326		—
1940	339		4.0%
1950	368		8.6%
1960	380		3.3%
1970	401		5.5%
1980	377		−6.0%
1990	353		−6.4%
2000	339		−4.0%
2010	342		0.9%
2016 (est.)	345	▲	0.9%

As of the census of 2000, there were 339 people, 139 households, and 89 families residing in the borough. The population density was 1,919.6 inhabitants per square mile (741.2/km^{2}). There were 146 housing units at an average density of 826.7 per square mile (319.2/km^{2}). The racial makeup of the borough was 98.23% White, 1.47% Asian, and 0.29% from two or more races. Hispanic or Latino of any race were 0.59% of the population.

There were 139 households, out of which 28.8% had children under the age of 18 living with them, 52.5% were married couples living together, 5.8% had a female householder with no husband present, and 35.3% were non-families. 30.9% of all households were made up of individuals, and 14.4% had someone living alone who was 65 years of age or older. The average household size was 2.44 and the average family size was 3.08.

In the borough, the population was spread out, with 23.3% under the age of 18, 8.0% from 18 to 24, 28.3% from 25 to 44, 20.6% from 45 to 64, and 19.8% who were 65 years of age or older. The median age was 37 years. For every 100 females, there were 103.0 males. For every 100 females age 18 and over, there were 88.4 males.

The median income for a household in the borough was $38,125, and the median income for a family was $48,594. Males had a median income of $30,536 versus $21,250 for females. The per capita income for the borough was $19,733. About 3.5% of families and 5.0% of the population were below the poverty line, including 9.1% of those under age 18 and 6.0% of those age 65 or over.

== Local events ==
The area's Strausstown Rod and Gun Club periodically hosts some of the state's best trap shooting events.

The Antique Auto Show & Flea Market is held annually at the Strausstown Lions Club Park.

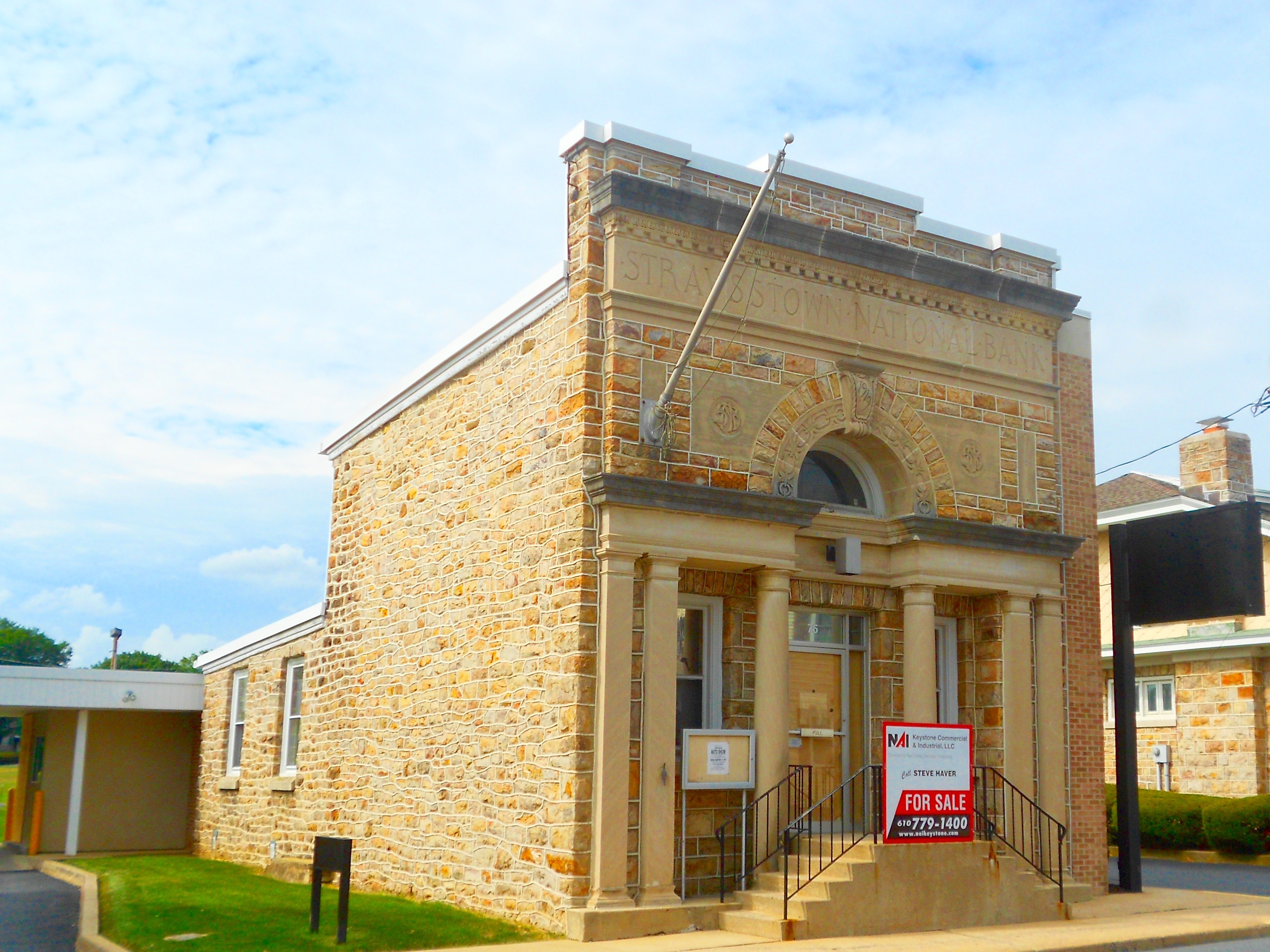
Old bank

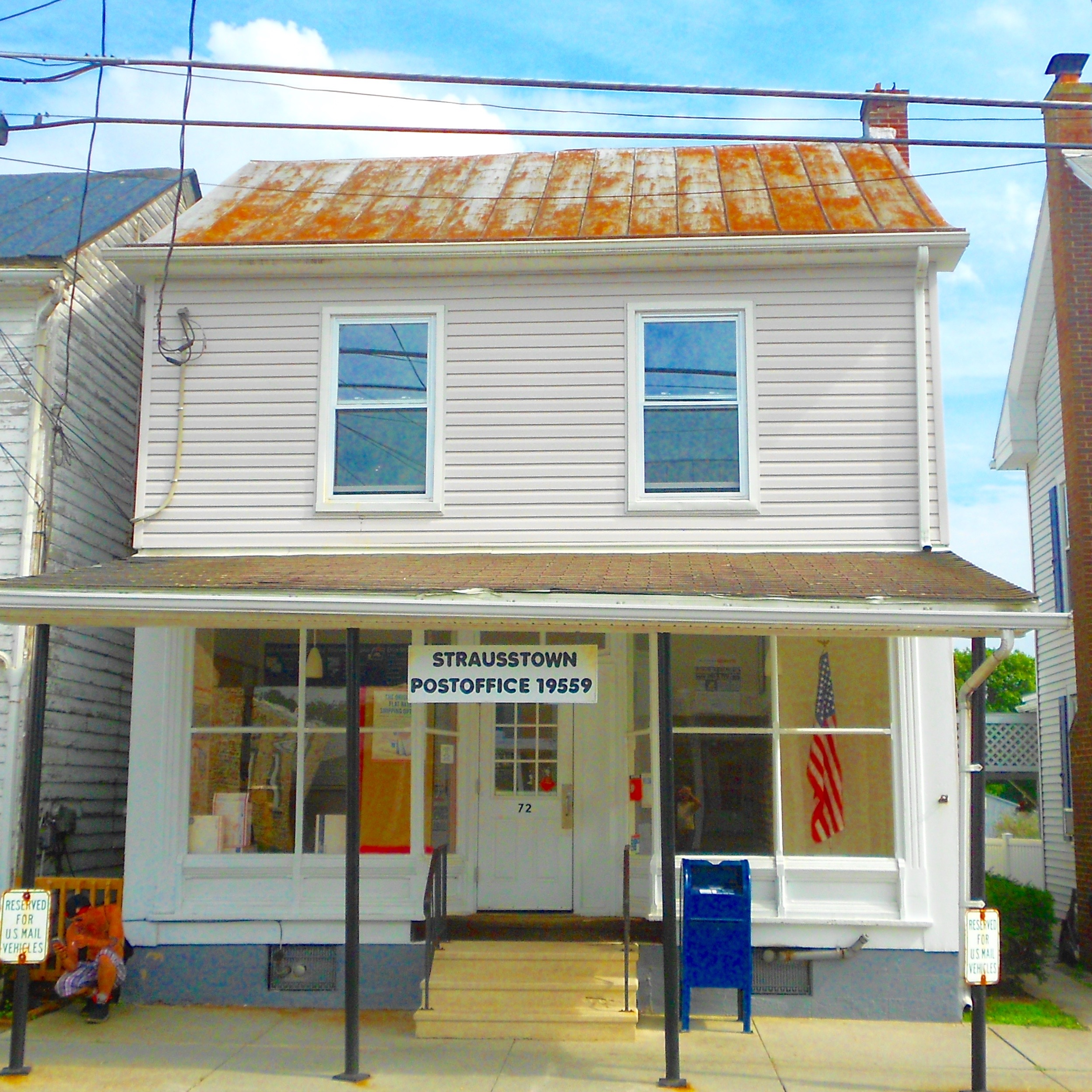
Post Office
