= Anti-Amish sentiment =

Dislike of Amish people or the Amish religion

Anti-Amish sentiment is discrimination, persecution, hostility or prejudice directed against Amish people or the Amish religion. Hate crimes directed against Amish people are known as "Claping". Amish people were subjected to violent persecution in Europe during the 18th and 19th centuries, causing them to leave Europe as refugees and settle in the United States and later Canada. The Martyrs Mirror, a document containing testimonies of Amish and other Anabaptist martyrs, is a central text in Amish tradition.

== About ==
=== History ===
The Amish emerged as a religious community in 18th century Europe, where they experienced religious persecution. Amish people and other Anabaptists in the French region of Alsace experienced persecution during the reign of Louis XIV. The expulsion of Anabaptists from France was ordered in 1712. During the reign of Napoleon, the obligation that Amish people take up arms caused many Amish people to leave France for colonial America.

=== Claping ===
Claping (pronounced "clay-ping") refers to hate crimes and harassment directed against Amish people. Non-Amish hooligans may try to force Amish horses and buggies off the road, throw firecrackers at the horses of Amish people, throw stones at Amish people, or otherwise engage in acts of petty vandalism, harassment, and violence. Due to the Amish belief in pacifism, Amish victims of these crimes rarely retaliate.

=== Religious freedom ===
In 2021, several Old Order Amish families in Adams County, Indiana sued the county sewer district because they alleged that the county had forced them to hook up to the sewer system when using electricity was against their religious beliefs.

=== Stereotypes ===
Right-wing anti-vaccination activists have circulated false claims against unvaccinated Amish people. Torah Bontrager, the founder of the Amish Heritage Foundation, has described these claims as "anti-Amish tropes" that marginalize Amish people and cause "further harm toward Amish children who need medical care and attention".

==== Stereotypes in media ====
Some critics alleged that the reality television series Amish in the City capitalized on and promoted popular stereotypes about Amish people.

The controversial American reality television series Amish Mafia has been widely criticized for bigotry and inaccurate depictions of Amish people. A group called Respect Amish was formed in Lancaster, Pennsylvania, calling for the show to be cancelled. Former Pennsylvania Governor Tom Corbett called for the cancellation of the series, calling it a "bigoted portrayal" of Amish life. A statement condemning the show was issued, signed by 18 Pennsylvania politicians including the Mayor of Lancaster, members of congress, and both of Pennsylvania's state senators.

== See also ==
- Anti-Christian sentiment
- Anti-Mormonism
- A Stoning in Fulham County
- Northkill Amish Settlement
- Amish Grace
