= Upper Tulpehocken Township, Pennsylvania =

Township in Pennsylvania, US

Upper Tulpehocken Township
- Township
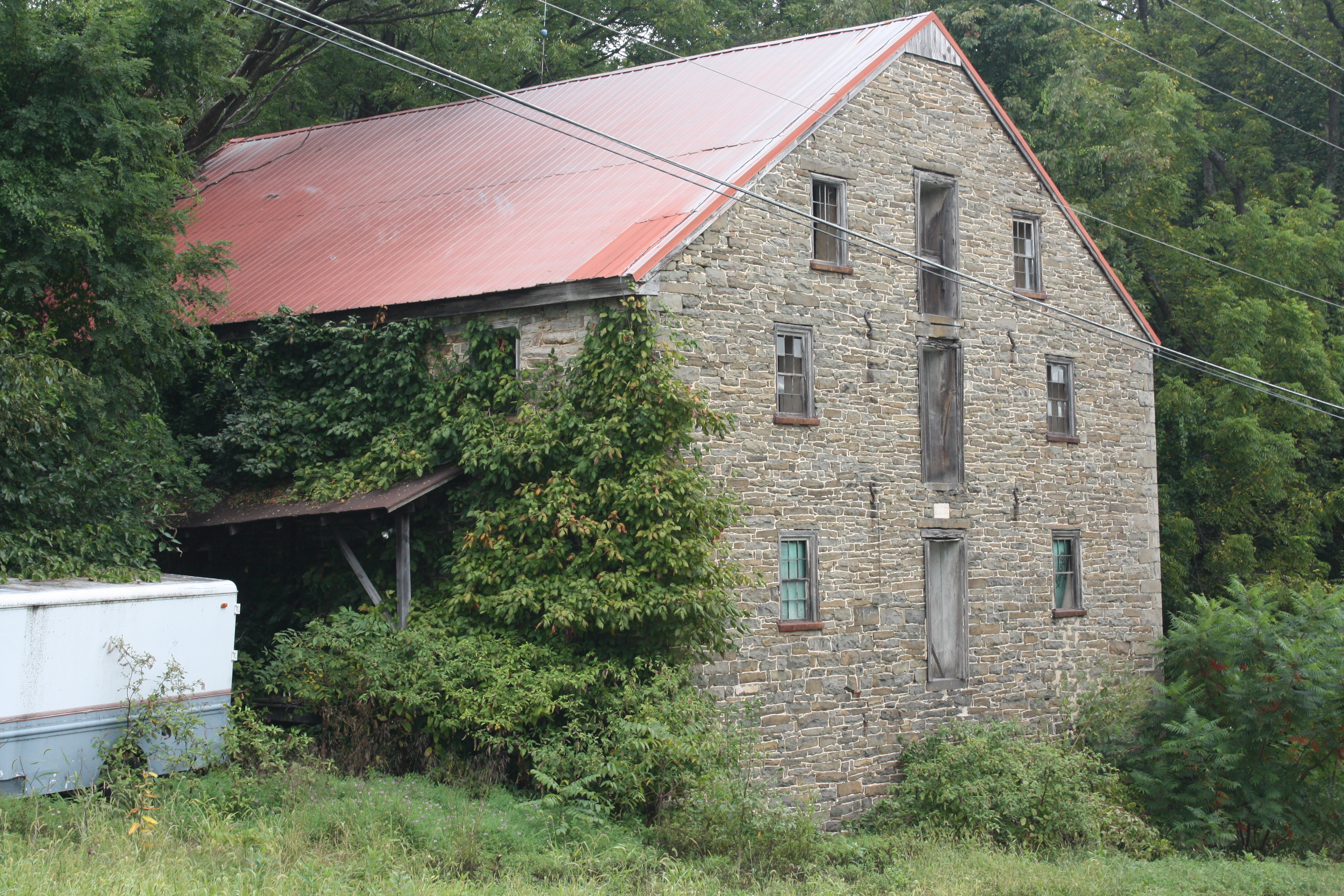
- Seyfert Mill

- Location of Upper Tulpehocken Township in Pennsylvania Upper Tulpehocken Township (the United States)
- Coordinates: 40°30′30″N 76°07′59″W
- Country: United States
- State: Pennsylvania
- County: Berks

Area
  - Total: 22.9 sq mi (59 km^{2})
  - Land: 22.9 sq mi (59 km^{2})
  - Water: 0.04 sq mi (0.10 km^{2})
- Elevation: 568 ft (173 m)

Population (2010)
  - Total: 1,575
  - Estimate (2016): 1,563
  - Density: 65.4/sq mi (25.3/km^{2})
- Time zone: UTC-5 (EST)
  - Summer (DST): UTC-4 (EDT)
- Area code: 610
- FIPS code: 42-011-79328
- Website: https://www.uppertulpehockentownship.com/

Upper Tulpehocken Township is a township in Berks County, Pennsylvania, United States. The population was 1,575 at the 2010 census.

== History ==
Tulpehocken is a name derived from a Native American language meaning "land of the turtles".

The Seyfert Mill was listed on the National Register of Historic Places in 1990.

In 2016, Strausstown voted to merge with Upper Tulpehocken Township.

== Geography ==
According to the U.S. Census Bureau, the township has a total area of 22.9 square miles (59.3 km^{2}), 22.9 square miles (59.2 km^{2}) of which is land and 0.04 square mile (0.1 km^{2}) (0.09%) of which is water.

Adjacent townships

- Berks County
  - Upper Bern Township (east)
  - Penn Township (southeast)
  - Jefferson Township (south)
  - Tulpehocken Township (southwest)
  - Bethel Township (west)
- Schuylkill County
  - Wayne Township (northwest)
  - South Manheim Township (northeast)

== Demographics ==
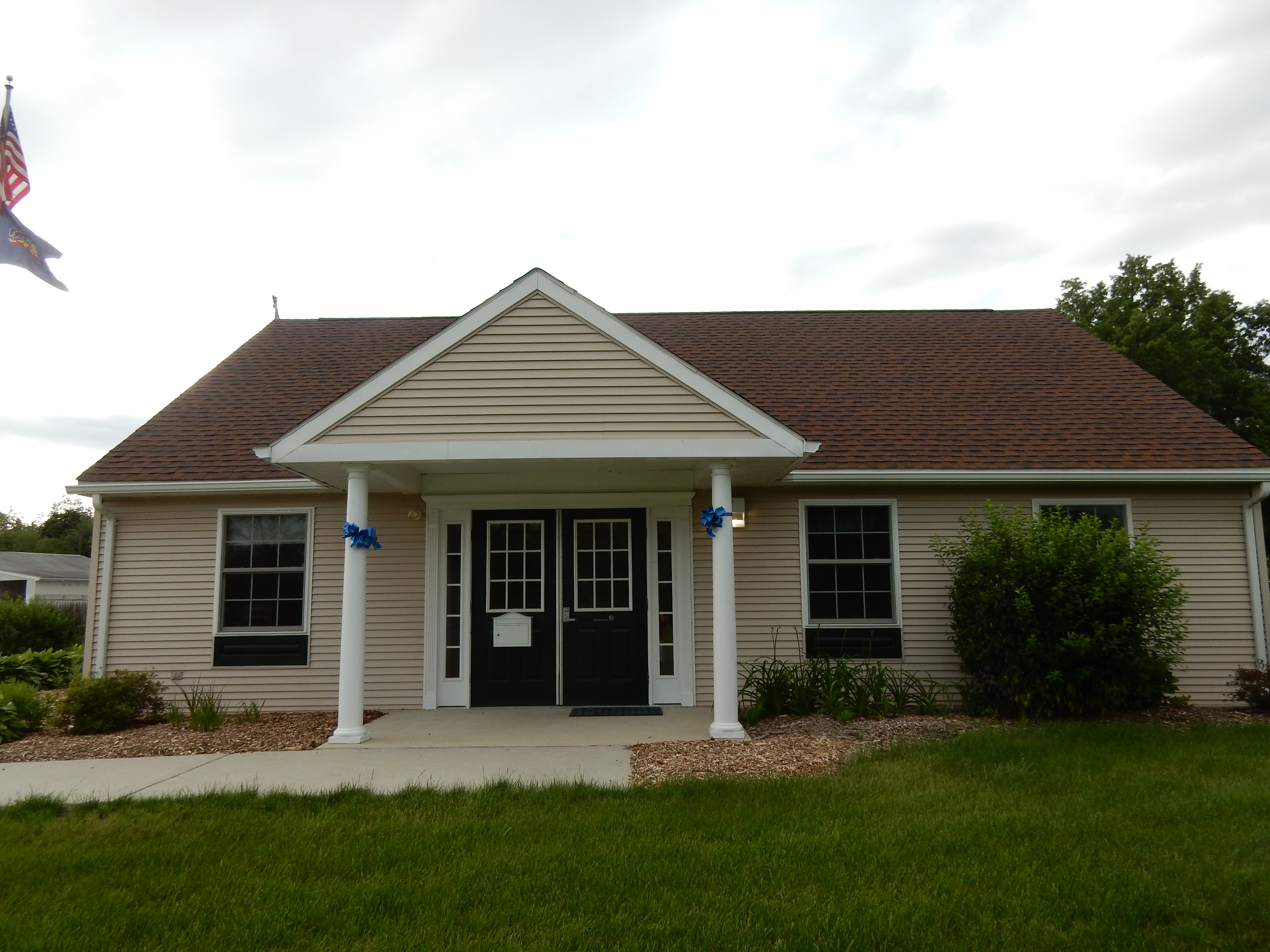
Township office

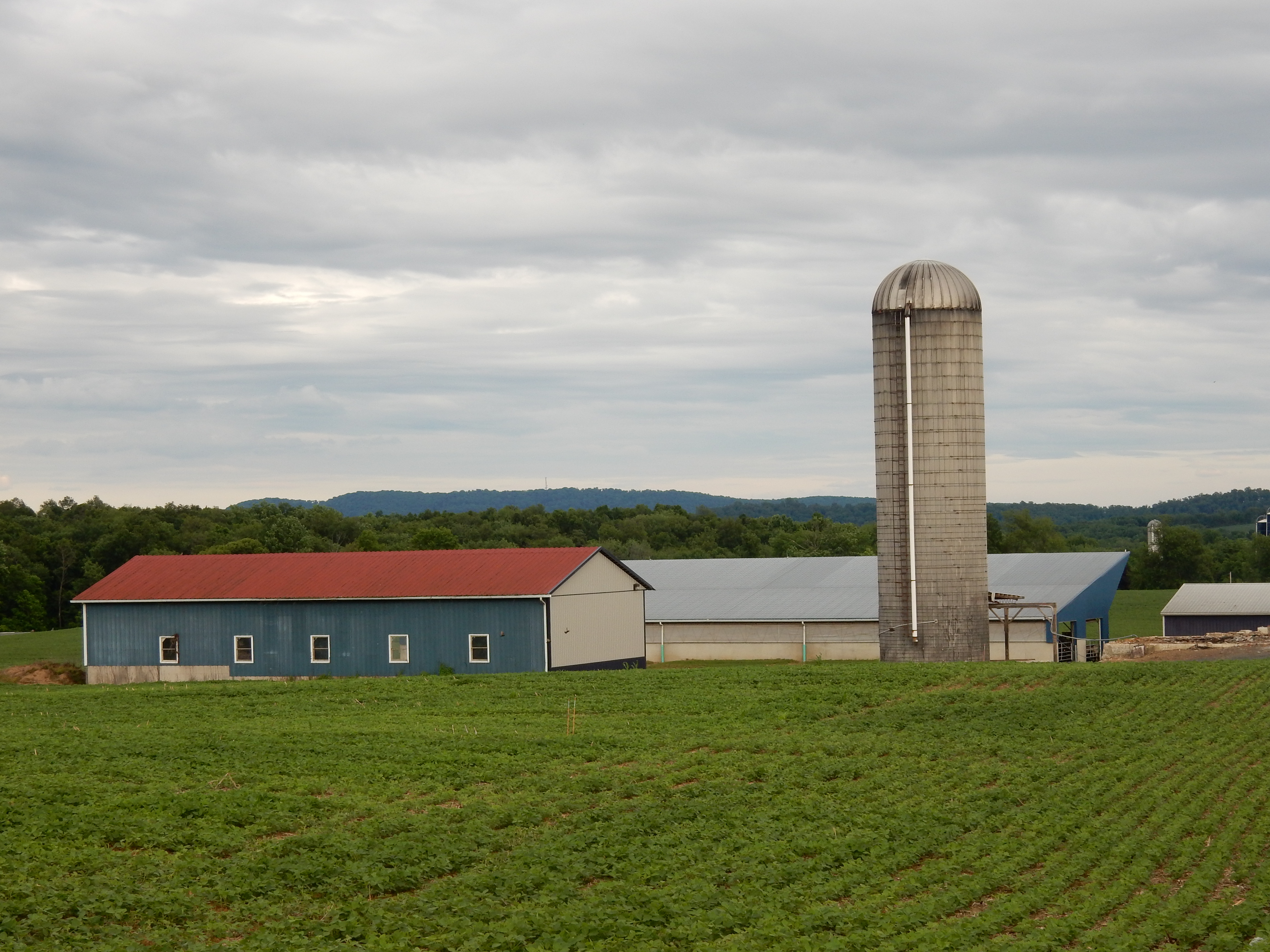
Farm in Upper Tulpehocken Township on Old Route 22

As of the census of 2000, there were 1,495 people, 538 households, and 392 families living in the township. The population density was 65.4 inhabitants per square mile (25.3/km^{2}). There were 587 housing units at an average density of 25.7/sq mi (9.9/km^{2}). The racial makeup of the township was 97.99% White, 0.60% African American, 0.13% Native American, 0.27% Asian, 0.07% Pacific Islander, 0.27% from other races, and 0.67% from two or more races. Hispanic or Latino of any race were 1.67% of the population.

Historical population
Census	Pop.	Note	%±
1980	1,154		—
1990	1,289		11.7%
2000	1,495		16.0%
2010	1,575		5.4%
2016 (est.)	1,563		−0.8%
Source: US Census Bureau

There were 538 households, out of which 33.1% had children under the age of 18 living with them, 63.8% were married couples living together, 3.9% had a female householder with no husband present, and 27.0% were non-families. 20.1% of all households were made up of individuals, and 8.0% had someone living alone who was 65 years of age or older. The average household size was 2.78 and the average family size was 3.27.

In the township the population was spread out, with 28.4% under the age of 18, 6.9% from 18 to 24, 30.2% from 25 to 44, 24.5% from 45 to 64, and 10.0% who were 65 years of age or older. The median age was 37 years. For every 100 females, there were 102.8 males. For every 100 females age 18 and over, there were 107.8 males.

The median income for a household in the township was $45,469, and the median income for a family was $50,188. Males had a median income of $35,403 versus $26,583 for females. The per capita income for the township was $18,699. About 5.8% of families and 7.5% of the population were below the poverty line, including 10.4% of those under age 18 and 7.9% of those age 65 or over.

== Recreation ==
Portions of the Pennsylvania State Game Lands Pennsylvania State Game Lands Number 110 which also carries the Appalachian National Scenic Trail is located along the northern border of the township.

== Transportation ==
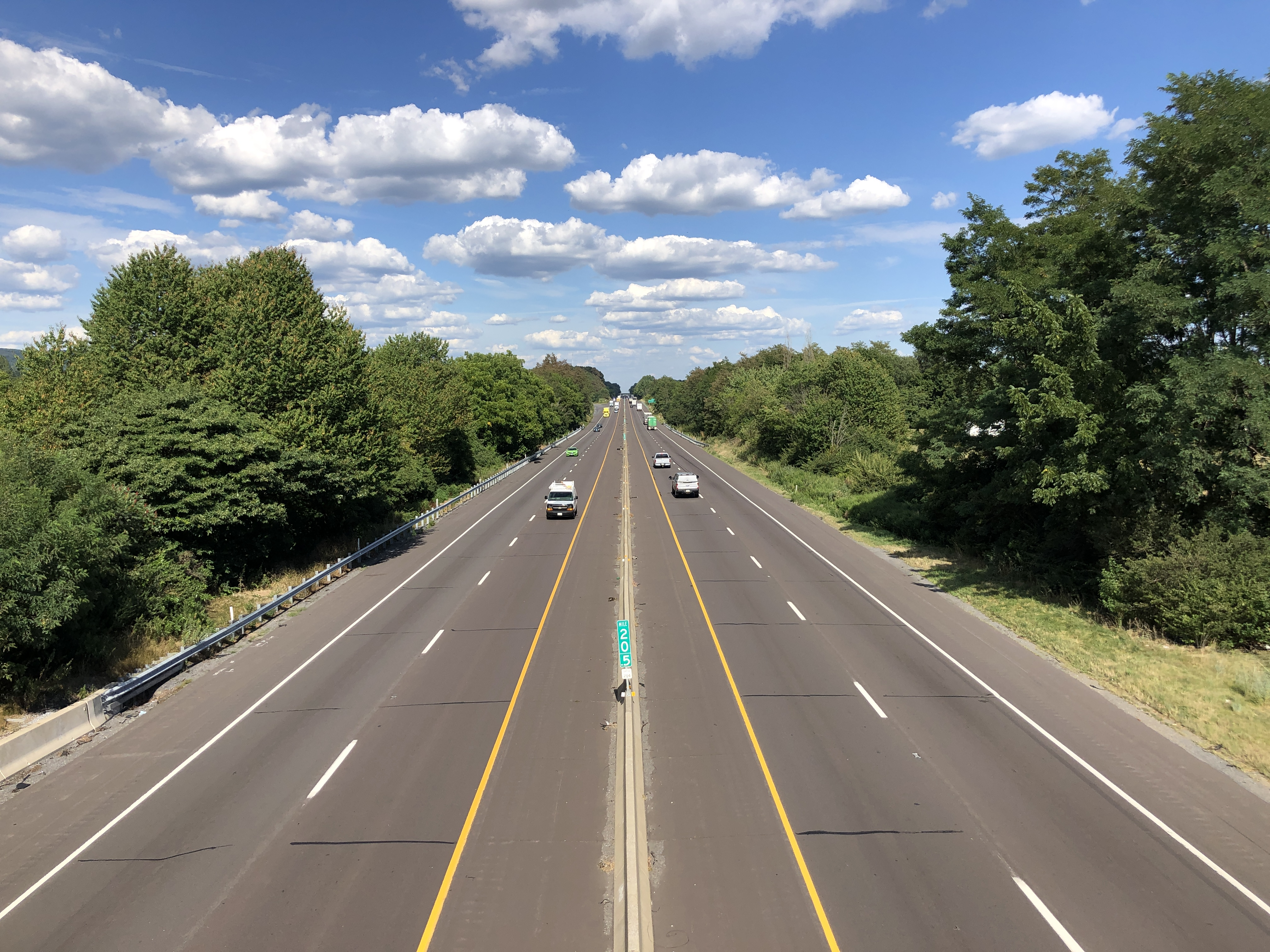
I-78/US 22 East in Upper Tulpehocken Township

As of 2020, there were 50.27 miles (80.90 km) of public roads in Upper Tulpehocken Township, of which 11.51 miles (18.52 km) were maintained by the Pennsylvania Department of Transportation (PennDOT) and 38.76 miles (62.38 km) were maintained by the township.

Interstate 78 and U.S. Route 22 are the main highways serving Upper Tulpehocken Township. They pass through the township concurrently on William Penn Highway along a southwest–northeast alignment through the middle of the township. Pennsylvania Route 183 also passes through the township, following a northwest–southeast alignment across southern and western portions of the township.
