= Northkill Creek =

Northkill
- Location of the mouth in Pennsylvania
- Etymology: Kille is middle Dutch for "water channel"

Location
- Country: United States
- State: Pennsylvania
- Cities: Bernville, Pennsylvania, Strausstown, Pennsylvania, Shartlesville, Pennsylvania, New Shaefferstown, Pennsylvania

Physical characteristics
- Source: Blue Mountain, in Pennsylvania
- Mouth: Tulpehocken Creek
  - location: Pennsylvania, United States
  - coordinates: 40.4252°N 76.1124°W
- Length: 11 mi (18 km)
- Basin size: 42 sq mi (110 km^{2})

Basin features
- Tributaries
  - left: Wolf Creek
  - right: Mollhead Creek, Little Northkill Creek

Northkill Creek is a stream primarily located in Berks County, Pennsylvania. It feeds into Tulpehocken Creek by way of Blue Marsh Lake and covers part of the Schuylkill River and Delaware River watersheds. Northkill Creek and its tributaries are high quality trout streams.

== Geography ==
Northkill Creek begins in the Northkill Gap on Blue Mountain near Shartlesville. The creek flows nearly 11 miles (18 km) roughly south to its confluence with Tulpehocken Creek just south of Bernville. Tributaries include Little Northkill, Mollhead and Wolf Creeks. The confluence with Little Northkill Creek is at Bernville. Northkill Creek's watershed covers approximately 42 square miles (110 km^{2}) in Jefferson, Penn, Tulpehocken, Upper Bern, and Upper Tulpehocken Townships and Bernville Borough in Berks County and South Manheim and Wayne Townships in Schuylkill County. The Little Northkill sub-watershed drains 52.5% of this area and provides approximately 60% of the total flow.

The bedrock is primarily sandstone interbedded with shale, slate, quartzite, chert and limestone fragments. Blue Mountain is underlain by sandstone, with quartz-rich rock. More moderate slopes are underlain by shale. This bedrock does not provide significant ability to neutralize acidic pollution. The shale component limits the bedrock's water-bearing properties and hence draught resistance.

== Land use ==
In the Northkill watershed, 61% of land is classified as agricultural and 37% as forested. Loss of farmland to non-agricultural use is estimated at 2,000 acres (8.1 km^{2}) annually.

== Stream quality ==
That portion of Northkill Creek from its source to the I-78 bridge is designated by the Pennsylvania Department of Environmental Protection as an Exceptional Value stream. The remainder (from I-78 to the Tulpehocken) is designated Cold Water Fishery. The Pennsylvania Fish and Boat Commission designates Northkill Creek and its tributaries as wild trout streams. As such Northkill Creek and its tributaries are important nurseries and refuges for wild trout. The creek is stocked with both brown and brook trout. The watershed has historically hosted American eel, but dams have contributed to a decline in that population. Other significant populations include cutlips minnow, common shiner, eastern blacknose dace, creek chub, and white sucker. Stream quality is stressed by acid rain (primarily from Ohio power plants), agricultural discharge (nitrates and phosphates), and non-agricultural development (siltation, road salt, animal waste, sewage).

== History ==
The water and associated flora and fauna of Northkill Creek supported the Lenape and early European settlers. Anabaptists and Lutherans settled the Northkill watershed in the early 18th century. In 1736, several Amish families purchased land along Northkill Creek. The Northkill Amish Settlement was the first organized Amish congregation in the U.S. The Hochstetlers, Yoders, Hetzlers and Millers were joined by Zugs, Jotters, Glicks, Kauffmans, and Bishop Jacob Hartzler, and eventually included more than 150 residents. They constructed stone houses, planted apple orchards, and harvested hay, wheat, and rye. This community would later disband and move elsewhere. In 1754, Fort Northkill was built about two miles (3 km) east of Strausstown, near the Northkill Creek and about one mile (1.6 km) south of the base of the Blue Mountain.

== See also ==
- List of rivers of Pennsylvania
