= Northkill Amish Settlement =

Historic religious community in Pennsylvania

Coordinates: 40.51206°N 76.11954°W

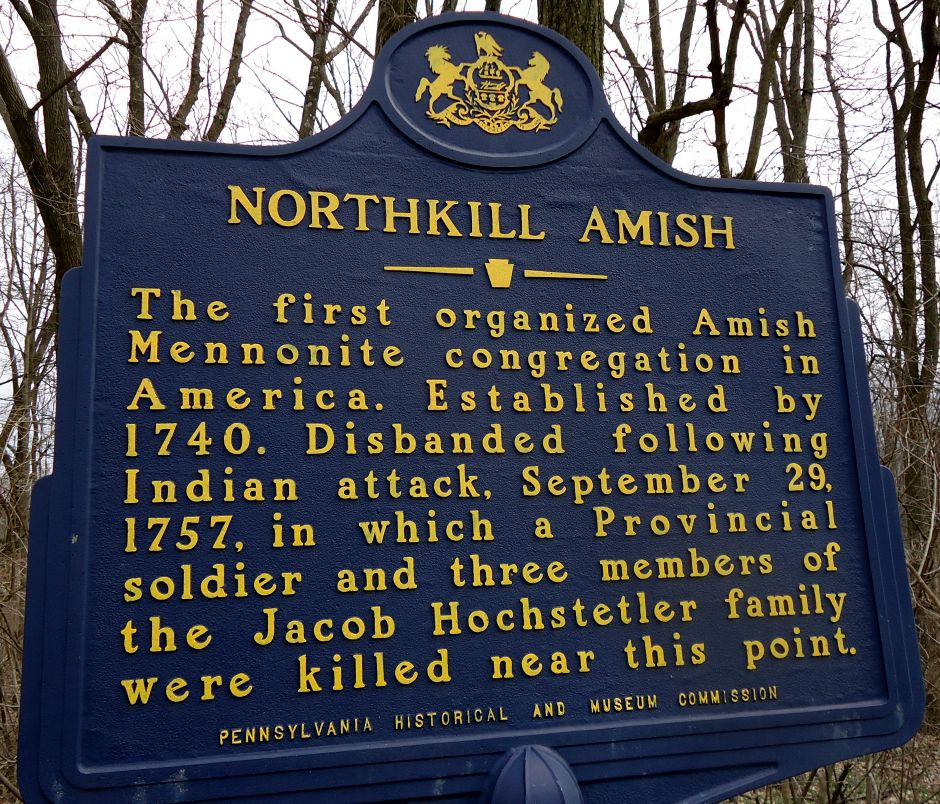
Historical marker for the Northkill Amish Settlement, which was destroyed by Lenape and Shawnee people in retaliation for Amish encroachment on their lands.

The Northkill Amish Settlement was established in 1740 in the Berks County of the Pennsylvania Colony of British America (now in the U.S. state of Pennsylvania). As the first identifiable Amish community in the New World, it was the foundation of Amish settlement in the Americas. By the 1780s it had become the largest Amish settlement, but declined as families moved elsewhere.

== Settlement ==
The first Amish began migrating to the United States in the 18th century, largely to avoid religious persecution and compulsory military service. The Northkill Creek watershed, in eastern Province of Pennsylvania, was opened for settlement in 1736 and that year Melchior Detweiler and Hans Seiber settled near Northkill. Shortly thereafter many Amish began to move to Northkill with large groups settling in 1742 and 1749.

In 1742, the group was large enough to petition the Pennsylvania Provincial Assembly of the Province of Pennsylvania for naturalization rights, allowing them to purchase land. The group was strengthened in 1749 when bishop Jacob Hertzler. settled in Northkill and the settlement grew to nearly 200 families at its height.

== Hochstetler massacre ==
The Northkill settlement was on the edge of the Blue Mountain, the legal boundary of European settlement according to agreements with Native Americans. During the French and Indian War, Lenape warriors under the command of three French scouts attacked the Northkill settlement on September 19, 1757. The Indians attacked the Jacob Hochstetler homestead and set the house on fire. The Indians stood guard around the house, so the family could not escape without risking their lives. The Hochstetlers possessed firearms in their home (which they used for hunting), but due to the Anabaptist Christian doctrine of nonresistance, Jacob Hochstetler refused to allow the weapons to be used against the Indians. As the fire worsened, the family escaped out the cellar window, but the wounded Jacob Jr. (he had been shot during the initial attack) and Jacob Sr.'s wife, Anna (Lorentz) Hochstetler, slowed them down. She became stuck in the window during her escape and was later stabbed in the back and scalped. Another daughter (name unknown) and Jacob Jr. were killed. Jacob Sr. and Joseph and Christian (aged 11 and 13 years) were taken captive.

Jacob escaped after about 8 months, but the boys were held for several years, and released in 1764 after a peace treaty between the natives and the British colonial authorities was agreed upon. Christian and Joseph Hochstetler became members of Christian churches that taught the doctrine of nonresistance. Christian converted to the Schwarzenau Brethren and became a minister. Altogether, more than one hundred and fifty Berks County residents were killed and about 150 were kidnapped by Native Americans during the French and Indian War. The number of Indians killed during this time is not known.

== Decline ==
Northkill remained the largest Amish settlement into the 1780s and then declined as families moved on to areas of better farmland, mainly to Lancaster County and Somerset County in Pennsylvania, where they formed the Lancaster Amish Settlement around 1760 and the Somerset Amish Settlement in 1772.

== Legacy ==
Although it existed for only a brief period, the Northkill settlement was fundamental in establishing the Amish in North America. The Northkill settlers included the progenitors of many widespread Amish families, such as the Yoders, Burkeys, Troyers, Hostetlers, and Hershbergers.

Jacob Hochstetler is the subject of Harvey Hostetler's book The Descendants of Jacob Hochstetler. In addition to listing the hundreds upon hundreds of Americans who share Jacob as a common ancestor, this book provides a detailed history of the Amish religious persecution in Europe, American immigration at the time, the massacre of Hochstetler's family members, and the kidnapping and subsequent escape of Jacob and his sons. The Hochstetler Massacre is also covered briefly in Paul Stutzman's account of his Appalachian Trail hike, which runs near the site. Stutzman claims to be a descendant of Jacob's daughter, Barbara Hochstetler Stutzman, already married and living nearby at the time of the attack, and continues with the following information about the site;

Beside old Rt. 22 and behind the tourist attraction housing Roadside America ... a historical marker tells of the Northkill Amish, the first Amish Mennonite settlement in America, and the Hochstetler massacre. The Northkill settlement dissolved after this attack."

== See also ==
- Anti-Amish sentiment
