= Fort Loudoun (Pennsylvania) =

18thCentury fort in Pennsylvania

- Peters Township, Franklin County, Pennsylvania, USA
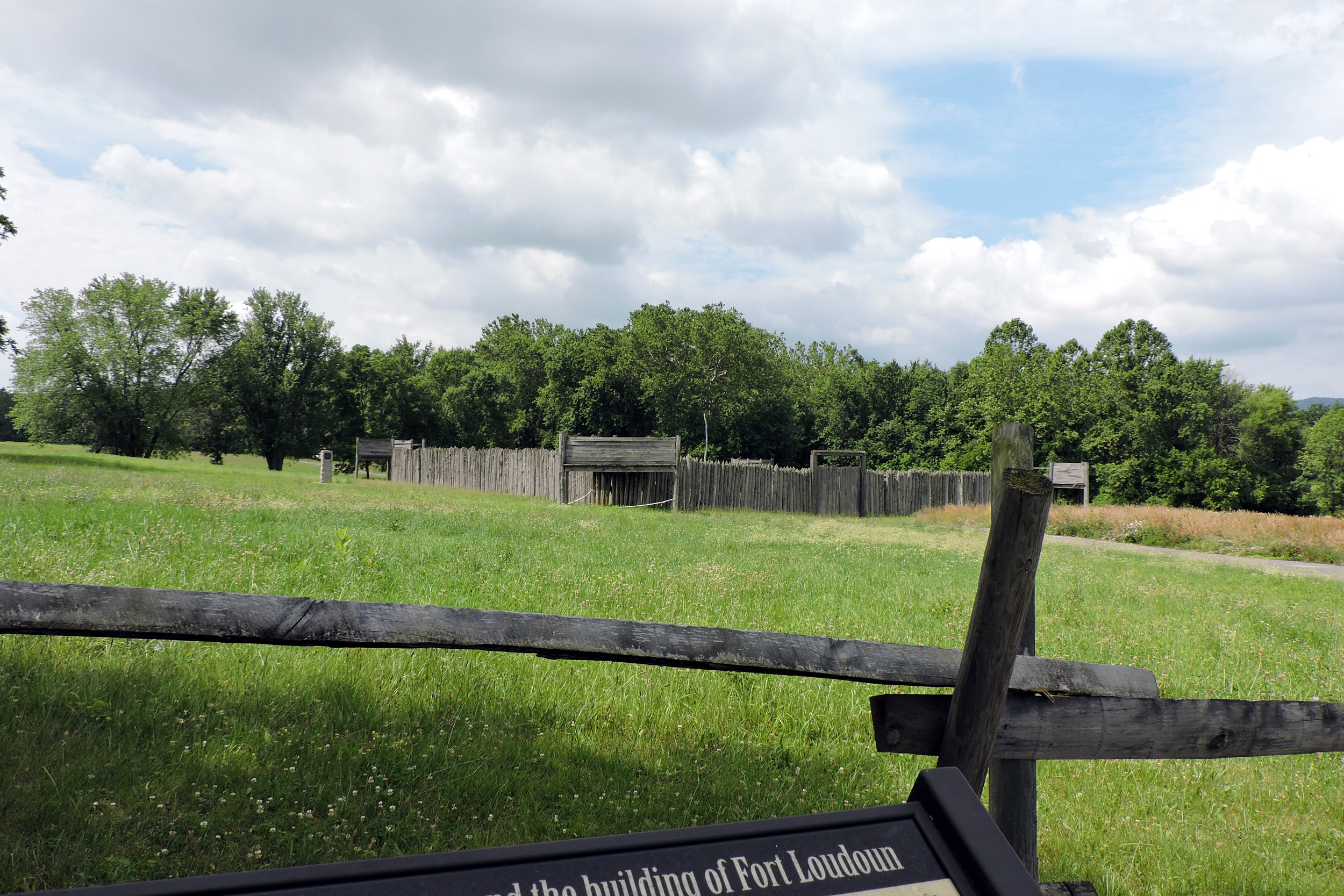
- Reconstruction of Fort Loudoun

Site information
- Type: Fort
- Controlled by: Commonwealth of Pennsylvania

Location
- Location of Fort Loudoun in Pennsylvania
- Coordinates: 39.915°N 77.91°W

Site history
- Built: 1756
- In use: 1756-1765
- Battles/wars: French and Indian War; Pontiac's War; Black Boys Rebellion

Garrison information
- Past commanders: Captain John Potter; Captain Joseph Armstrong; Captain William Armstrong; Captain William Thompson; Lieutenant Charles Grant
- Garrison: 14-100 men plus officers

Pennsylvania Historical Marker
- Designated: October 01, 1915; May 27, 1947

Fort Loudoun (or Fort Loudon, after the modern spelling of the town) was a fort in colonial Pennsylvania, one of several forts in colonial America named after John Campbell, 4th Earl of Loudoun. The fort was built in 1756 during the French and Indian War by the Second Battalion of the Pennsylvania Regiment under Colonel John Armstrong, and served as a post on the Forbes Road during the Forbes expedition that successfully drove the French away from Fort Duquesne. The fort remained occupied through Pontiac's War and served as a base for Colonel Henry Bouquet's 1764 campaign. In the 1765 Black Boys Rebellion, Fort Loudoun was assaulted by angry settlers, when their guns were confiscated after they destroyed supplies intended for Native Americans. The garrison retreated to Fort Bedford and the fort was abandoned.

== History ==
At the beginning of the French and Indian War, Edward Braddock's defeat left Pennsylvania without a professional military force. Lenape chiefs Shingas and Captain Jacobs launched dozens of Shawnee and Delaware raids against British colonial settlements, killing and capturing hundreds of colonists and destroying settlements across western and central Pennsylvania. In late 1755, Colonel John Armstrong wrote to Governor Robert Hunter Morris: "I am of the opinion that no other means of defense than a chain of blockhouses along or near the south side of the Kittatinny Mountains from the Susquehanna to the temporary line, can secure the lives and property of the inhabitants of this country, the new settlements being all fled except Shearman's Valley." Construction on several new forts was begun in December 1755.

=== Construction ===
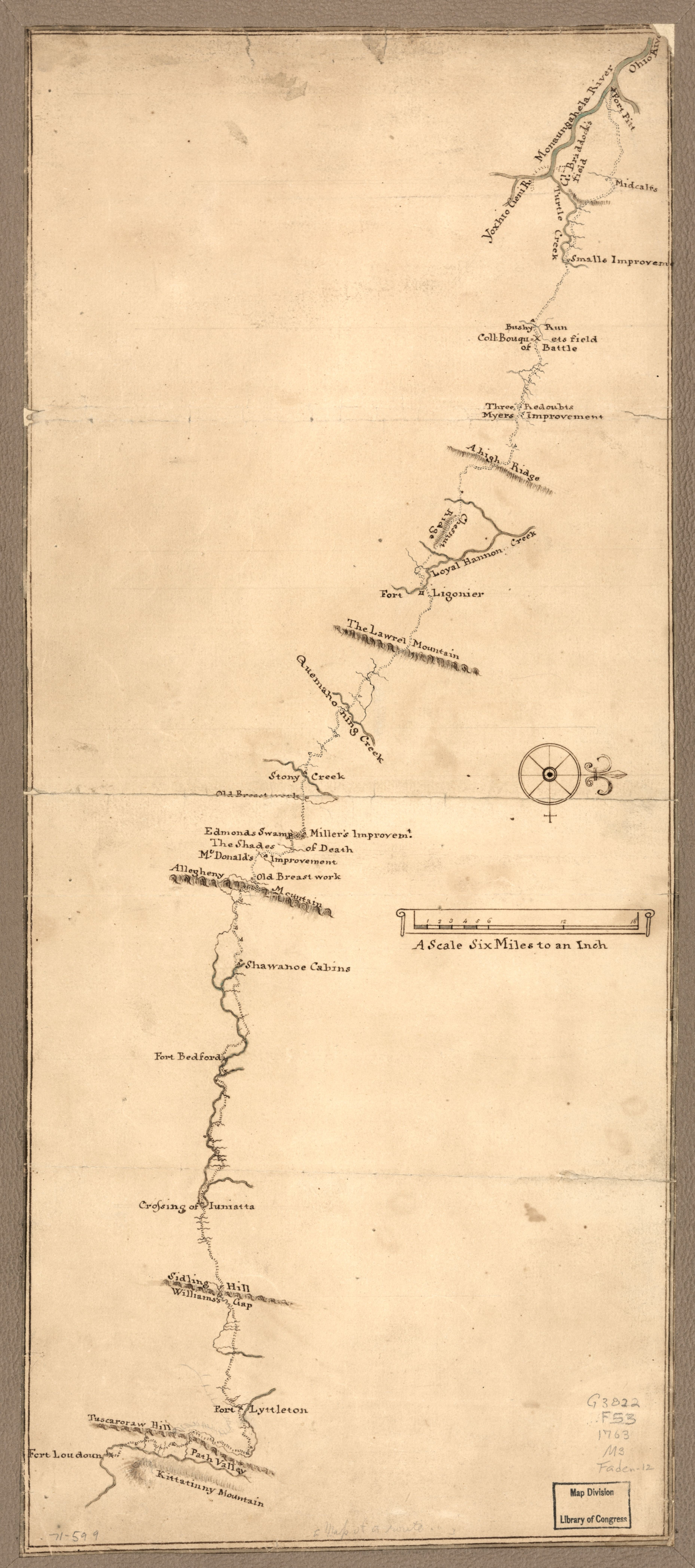
1763 map of a route through southwest Pennsylvania from Fort Loudoun to Fort Pitt, Pittsburgh. Fort Loudoun is shown in the bottom left corner of the page.

Governor Morris ordered these forts to be built under the direction of Colonel Armstrong. In late 1755, construction began on Fort Morris in Shippensburg, Fort Lyttleton, and Carlisle Fort. George Croghan also supervised the construction of Fort Granville and Fort Shirley. Fort Loudoun was intended to replace a simple privately-built stockade at McDowell's Mill, which was too small to adequately defend the area. Shingas had assaulted the mill in February 1756 with 80 warriors and had almost taken it, until the battle was interrupted by a blizzard.

The siege and destruction of Fort Granville in August 1756 raised fears that the forts were too far apart and too difficult to supply. In September, following the assault on Kittanning, a Lenape staging area for raids on Pennsylvania settlements, Colonel Armstrong decided to place a fort midway between Shippensburg and Fort Lyttleton. The new governor, William Denny, consulted Lieutenant Elias Meyer, a British army engineer, who helped determine a good location for the fort. In November a site was selected near Parnell Knob, on land owned by a farmer Matthew Patton. He had started building a farmhouse, which Armstrong incorporated into the fort, writing to Governor Denny on 19 November:

"I'm makeing the best preparation in my power to forward this Fort, as well as to prepare the barracks, and the others for the approaching winter. Yesterday the Escort of one hundred men returned from Lyttleton who left the Cattle &c, safe there and to-day we begin to Digg a Cellar in the New Fort; the Loggs & Roof of a New House having there been Erected by Patton...We shall apprise this House, and then take the benefit of it, either for Officers' Barracks or a Store-House."

Construction of most of the fort's buildings was done by late December, but due to the weather, the stockade was not completed until early spring of 1757. Armstrong hired a team of builders to continue work on the fort, and additions and improvements were still being made in mid-1758. Governor Morris named Fort Loudoun after John Campbell, 4th Earl of Loudoun, Commander-in-Chief of the British military in North America and Governor General of Virginia (1705-1782).

=== Description ===
Construction followed a standard design adopted by Governor Robert Hunter Morris, typically a 100-foot square stockade with bastions at the four corners, and several buildings inside, including a barracks, an officers' quarters, a gunpowder magazine, a kitchen and a storehouse. In addition, Morris recommended that the fort be "a square with one ravelin to protect the curtain where the gate is, with a ditch, covered way, and glacis." An external building known as "the Bower" was constructed to serve as a meeting house for conferences with Native Americans, and this was later converted into a summer house for visiting officers and other dignitaries to stay in. Armstrong was assisted in the construction by Captain (later colonel) James Burd. The Reverend Thomas Barton, an army chaplain who was stationed at Fort Loudoun, described Fort Loudoun in a letter on July 21, 1758: "The Fort is a poor Piece of Work, irregularly built, & badly situated at the Bottom of a Hill Subject to Damps & noxious Vapours. It has something like Bastions supported by Props, which if an Enemy should cut away, down tumbles Men & all...The Fort is properly a square Ridout of 120 feet."

== Military history ==
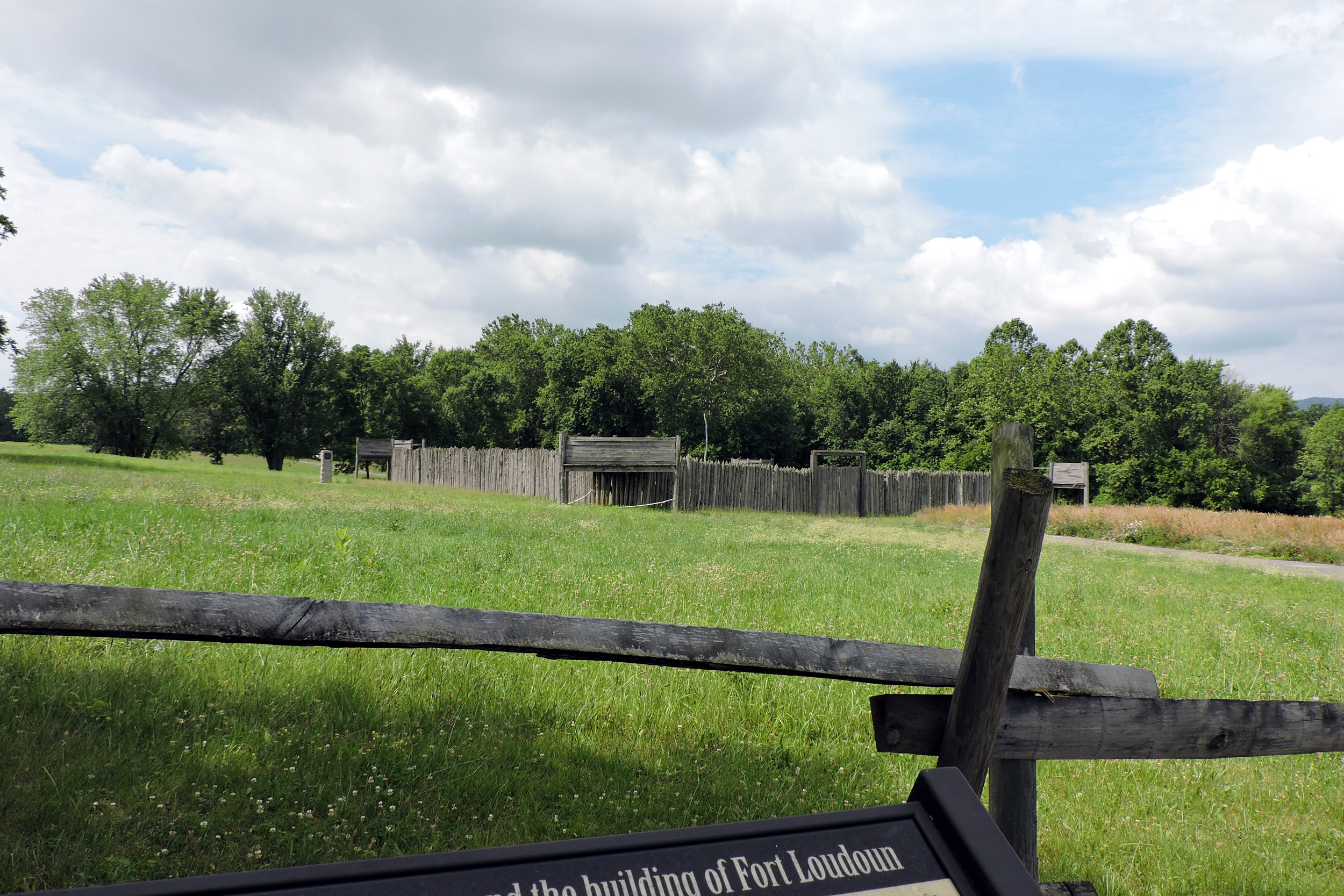
View of the reconstruction of Fort Loudoun showing the shooting platforms at each corner.

The fort was initially garrisoned by 100 troops from the Second Battalion of the Pennsylvania Regiment. In May 1757, 60 Cherokee warriors arrived, and were initially mistaken for enemies. A party of soldiers was sent from Fort Loudoun to attack their camp, but an interpreter was able to stop them. Governor Denny then sent the Cherokees a message, offering guns and gunpowder as payment for their services as scouts. Cherokees later served as rangers and scouts, although they were considered unreliable.

Fort Loudoun served as an important supply depot during the Forbes Expedition and the construction of the Forbes Road, with troops pausing to camp at the fort frequently as they prepared to attack Fort Duquesne. In June 1758, Colonel Bouquet held a conference in the Bower with over a hundred Cherokee warriors who had offered to join in the expedition. In October 1758, Colonel Henry Bouquet recommended that the garrison be maintained at 100 men plus officers. Towards the end of 1758, one of the battalion's companies was replaced by a troop of light cavalry.

After the 1758 Treaty of Easton, the fort's garrison was reduced to 14 men. In 1759, Matthew Patton, the owner of the land on which the fort was built, returned and filed a petition with the provincial government for damages to his property. Having no place to live, he was allowed to stay in the fort while rebuilding his farmhouse.

Fort Loudoun was used by Colonel Bouquet as a base for his campaign of 1764. In a letter written on 15 August 1764, Bouquet noted that the fort was already deteriorating: "The store houses for Provisions at this Fort are in a ruinous Condition, having originally been only little huts of Logs for Provincial Soldiers, and Swarming with Rats, by which the Provisions suffer considerably." The fort was subsequently garrisoned by a detachment of the 42nd Royal Highland Regiment of Foot, known as the Black Watch.

=== Black Boys Rebellion, 1765 ===
1770 map of the Province of Pennsylvania showing Fort Loudoun at the center of the map's lower edge.

In March 1765 a pack train of goods owned by George Croghan was intercepted by Pennsylvania settlers, who were concerned that "warlike goods" including weapons and rum were being sent to Native Americans in exchange for land and other favors, in defiance of the Royal Proclamation of 1763 which forbade the sale of "war-like" trade items (guns, knives, tomahawks, gunpowder, lead, rum, whiskey) to Native Americans. Croghan was interested in obtaining rights to land in the Ohio Country, and hoped to use the trade goods to win favor from Shawnee and Lenape chiefs before large numbers of settlers began moving west. The contents of the pack train were discovered when a pack fell to the ground and burst open, revealing scalping knives. Magistrate William McDowell attempted to halt the pack train for inspection, but the drivers refused and continued on towards Fort Pitt.

The next day, a group of ten armed citizens led by James Smith intercepted the pack train during a snow storm and requested that the goods be stored at Fort Loudoun until it could be determined if they were in fact illegal. When the drivers refused, Smith's men killed several of the pack horses, then confiscated the goods and burned them. The pack train drivers fled to Fort Loudoun. At the fort, Lieutenant Charles Grant sent Sergeant Leonard McGlashen and a platoon of men to search for the "highwaymen" they thought had attacked the pack train. They detained eight suspects for questioning and returned to Fort Loudoun.

In May 1765, Smith's men intercepted another pack train headed to Fort Pitt. After an exchange of shots with Smith's men at a local farmhouse, in which one man was wounded, soldiers from the fort confiscated their weapons and returned to Fort Loudoun. In November, Governor John Penn decided to transfer Fort Loudon's garrison to Fort Pitt. James Smith gathered over a hundred men and besieged the fort, demanding the return of their nine guns and the delivery of Lieutenant Grant and Sergeant McGlashan as prisoners. They maintained a constant fire on the fort for two nights, while the garrison returned only one shot, as they were low on powder and ammunition. Finally, on 17 November, Grant turned over the confiscated guns to local magistrate William McDowell. The fort's garrison was then permitted to withdraw to Fort Bedford.

== Abandonment, 1765 ==
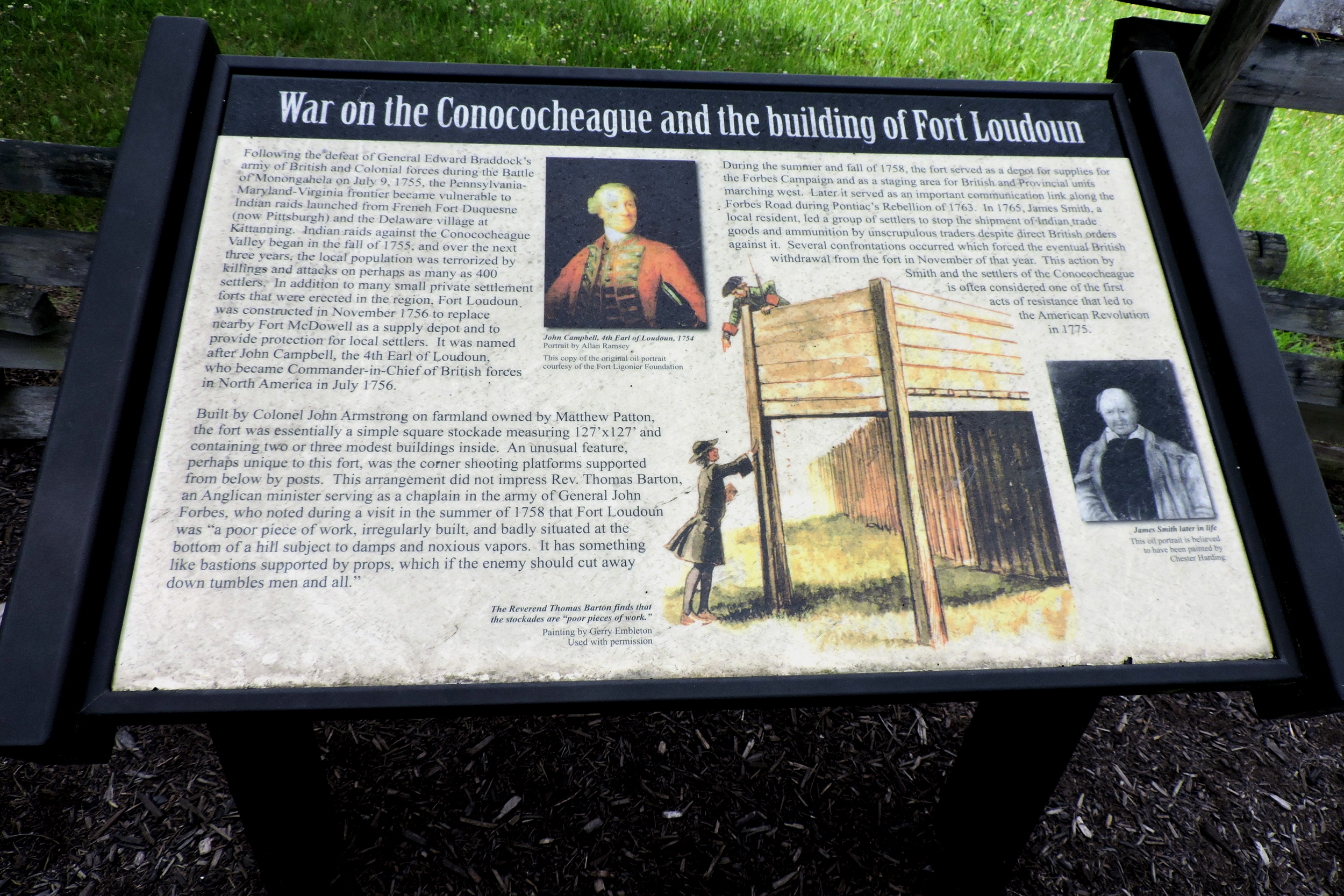
Information board at the Fort Loudoun Historical Society, showing the Earl of Loudoun, one of the fort's shooting platforms, and James Smith.

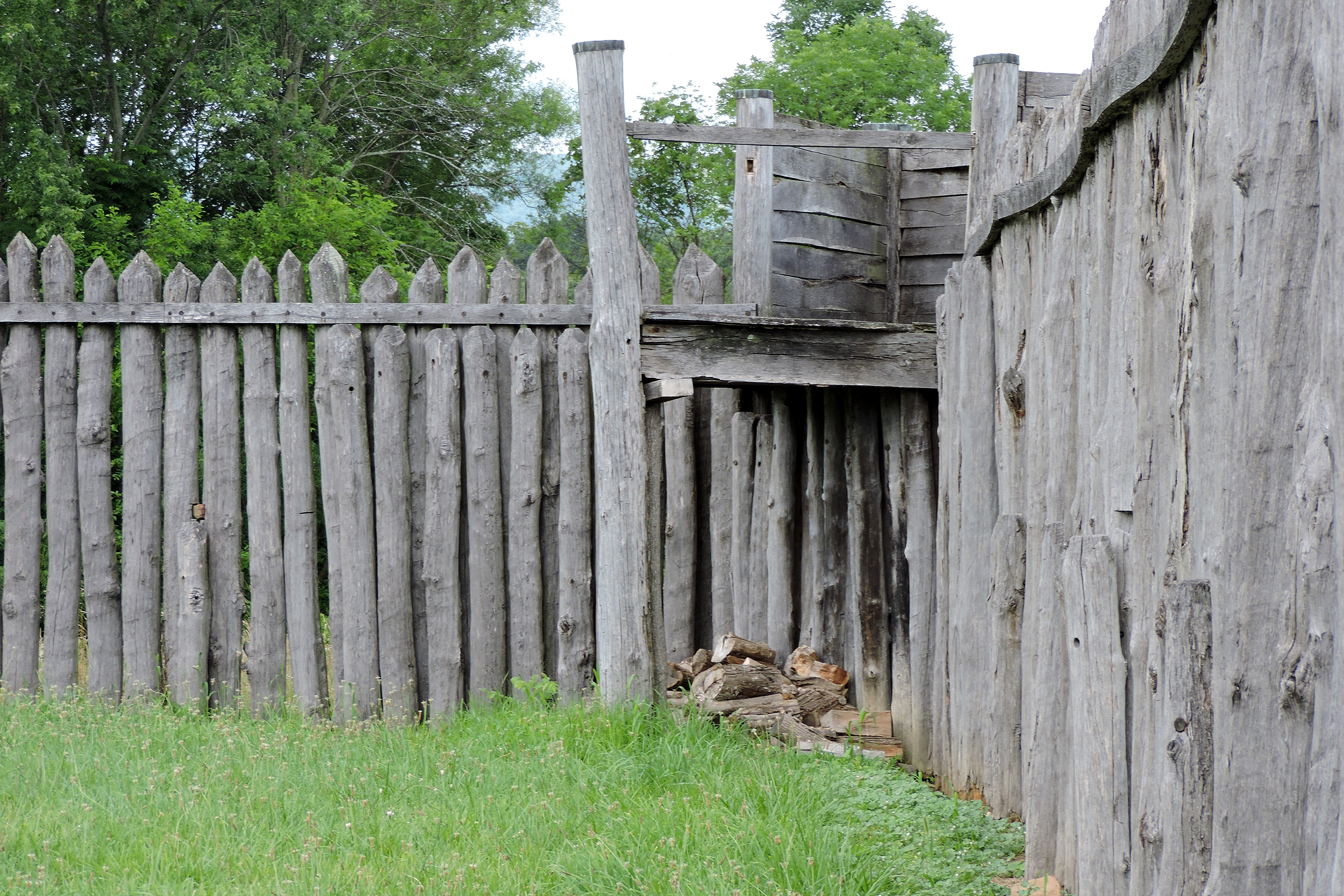
Interior of the reconstructed Fort Loudoun.

The fort was not garrisoned again, having previously been scheduled for abandonment, and was used only for storage after 1765. Matthew Patton rebuilt his farm and demolished the fort in 1767, using some of the lumber for his new home.

== Memorialization and Reconstruction ==
A historical marker with a brass plaque was placed 20 October, 1915 near the fort's site on Old Lincoln Highway (U.S. Route 30 in Pennsylvania). A second marker was placed one mile east of the fort's site on 27 May 1947, but has been reported missing.

The 1939 film Allegheny Uprising, starring John Wayne, Claire Trevor, and George Sanders, while somewhat fictionalized, depicts the events surrounding the Black Boys Rebellion and Smith's attack on the fort. It underperformed upon its release, due in part to similar movies being released in close proximity and a temporary ban in the British market due to perceived criticism of that nation.

A replica of the fort was built by the Fort Loudoun Historical Society, on the original site in 1993. The stockade wall and gun bastions were replaced in 2018-2019. Local volunteers, working in conjunction with the Historical Society, have reconstructed several buildings that would have stood within the fort at the time of its occupation in the 1760s, including a barracks, storehouse, and guardhouse, as well as period-accurate amenities such as a blacksmith's forge, wood-fired baking oven, and a hand-dug well.

New interpretive signage was installed in 2024 in partnership with the Lincoln Highway Heritage Corridor, offering greater detail to visitors when tour guides are unavailable. The 1780 Patton house has also been restored and serves as a welcome center, museum, and gift shop.

The fort hosts several events throughout the year, most notably "Across the Centuries," an exposition of military forces from different eras and countries throughout history; "Tavern Night," a showcase of typical colonial living held every October; and the "Allegheny Uprising," a commemoration of the 1765 rebellion held every November, falling closely on the anniversary of the siege.

== Archaeology ==
The State of Pennsylvania purchased the fort site farm in 1967 under the Project 70 Land Acquisition and Borrowing Act. During a dig in 1977, Dr. Barry Kent found evidence of the palisade walls and an 18th-century cellar near the farmhouse. In 1980, 1981 and 1982 digs uncovered the entire palisade trench, a stone-lined well, postholes and mold remains of structures, a trash midden, root cellars, and drains. The first Matthew Patton house was uncovered as well as another one burned by Native Americans. The excavations indicated that the stockade was built with 8-inch wooden posts, with smaller backup posts of 3 inches, in a trench measuring 127 feet by 127 feet. Three of the four corners were uncovered and were found to be angled. Shooting platforms appeared to have been on the northeast and southwest corners. The gate was located on the northern wall. The fort's well and a drainage trench were also found. The well was filled with debris and at the bottom, the original well bucket was found resting in water.
