= Great Cove massacre =

Attack by Lenape and Shawnee warriors on a Pennsylvania pioneer settlement in 1755

- Part of the French and Indian War
- Location of Great Cove settlement in the Province of Pennsylvania, 1755
- Location: 39°55′58″N 77°59′46″W; Great Cove (present day McConnellsburg, Pennsylvania)
- Date: 1 November 1755
- Attack type: Mass murder
- Deaths: 7-32 killed
- Victim: European settlers
- Assailants: Lenape and Shawnee warriors

The Great Cove massacre was an attack by Shawnee and Lenape warriors led by Shingas, on the community of Great Cove, Pennsylvania (sometimes referred to as Big Cove, modern day McConnellsburg, Pennsylvania in what was, at the time, Cumberland County) on 1 November 1755, in which about 50 settlers were killed or captured. Following the attack, settlers returned to the community to rebuild, and the Provincial Council of Pennsylvania began constructing a chain of forts and blockhouses to protect settlers and fend off further raids. These forts provided an important defense during the French and Indian War.

== Background ==
1770 map of the Province of Pennsylvania showing Great Cove and Little Cove at the map's lower edge, just to the left of center.

The communities of Great Cove, Little Cove (Franklin County) and the Conolloways were probably settled soon after 1730 by Scotch-Irish immigrants. The land at that time was still recognized as belonging to Native Americans, but settlers set up homesteads and cleared the land without seeking formal ownership, in spite of "frequent prohibitions on the part of the government and admonitions of the great danger they run of being cut off by the Indians, as these settlements were on lands not purchased of them." In 1742, the Six Nations Iroquois Confederacy lodged a formal complaint, and settlers were warned against establishing homesteads in the area, but they continued to do so. In May 1750, 62 settlers living illegally on the Aughwick, Licking Creek and at Great Cove were convicted of trespassing and forcibly expelled by Provincial government authorities. The commission overseeing the expulsion included Conrad Weiser, Richard Peters, George Croghan and Sheriff John Potter of Cumberland County. Eleven cabins were burned in Path Valley, and three cabins were burned in Great Cove. The area was subsequently referred to as Burnt Cabins, Pennsylvania. Nonetheless, settlers returned to the area and reestablished their communities. Within a few months of burning the cabins, Richard Peters wrote to Conrad Weiser that "The People over the Hills are combin'd against the Government, [and] are putting in new Cropps and bid us Defiance." On the date of the massacre, 93 families are known to have resided in Great Cove, Little Cove, and the Conolloways.

Following General Edward Braddock's defeat on 9 July 1755 at the Battle of the Monongahela, at the beginning of the French and Indian War, Pennsylvania was left without a professional military force. Lenape chiefs Shingas and Captain Jacobs launched dozens of Shawnee and Delaware raids against British colonial settlements, killing and capturing hundreds of colonists and destroying settlements across western and central Pennsylvania. The nearby settlement of Penn's Creek was destroyed by Lenape warriors on 16 October.

== Massacre ==
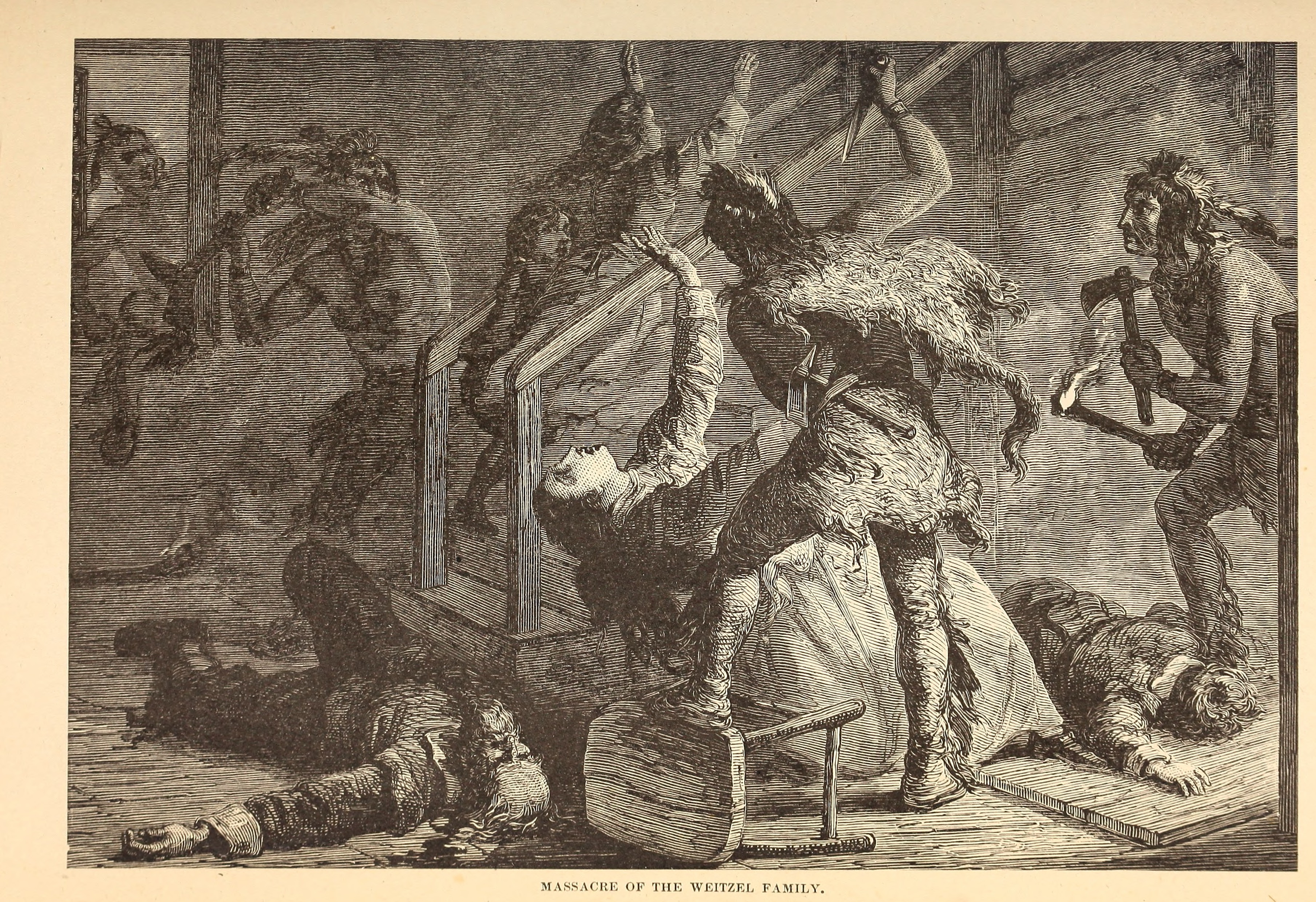
19th century woodcut depicting a raid by Native American warriors on a colonial settlement similar to Great Cove.

On 1 November 1755, a band of about 100 Lenape and Shawnee warriors, and possibly a few French soldiers, launched attacks on the Great Cove settlement and a neighboring settlement known as the Conolloways, with the force splitting into two groups of 50 just before the assault. The Lenape chief Shingas is known to have participated, and also Captain Jacobs. At least one source states that the Lenape leader Tamaqua also took part in the attack. Some of the settlers received advance warning of the attack, reportedly from a settler named Patrick Burns who had escaped from captivity among the Indians, and about half of those living in the two communities fled.

On 2 November, The Pennsylvania Gazette reported:

"By Express this Day from Conegochtig (Conococheague) we are informed, that Yesterday the Settlements in the Great Cove and Cannalaways [Conolloways, a community on the Tonoloway Creek] were attacked by a Party of Indians, and several Houses seen in Flames, which, with the Firing of many Guns, gives sufficient Reason to think that the Inhabitants are all cut off or fled; we expect daily to be attacked here, and at Harris's Ferry, as these two Places have been particularly threatned: We have great Numbers from Lancaster and York Counties coming in every Day to our Assistance."

In a letter written on 2 November, Sheriff Potter gives an account of the attack and describes his efforts to pursue the Indians, stating that he took 40 men into the community but did not encounter any of the attackers. Later they were joined by "a recruit" of 60 men and "held counsel whether to pursue up the valley all night or return to McDowell's, [but]...there were not six of these men that would consent to go in pursuit of the Indians." On 6 November, Adam Hoops wrote to Governor Robert Morris that Captain Hance Hamilton was arriving from York County with 200 men and that another 200 men from Lancaster County were prepared to fight. Pennsylvania militia searched the area but lost the trail in the newly-fallen snow, although they found the body of a child, probably killed because he or she was unable to keep pace with the fleeing warriors.

No definitive account of the number of casualties exists, although a Pennsylvania Gazette article published on 13 November names seven of those killed and eighteen taken captive, 11 of whom were children. Sheriff Potter testified on 14 November to provincial authorities that "of ninety-three families which were settled in the two coves and the Conolloways, forty-seven [persons] were either killed or taken [prisoner]." In his letter of 6 November, Adam Hoops reported "about fifty persons killed or taken."

== Captives ==
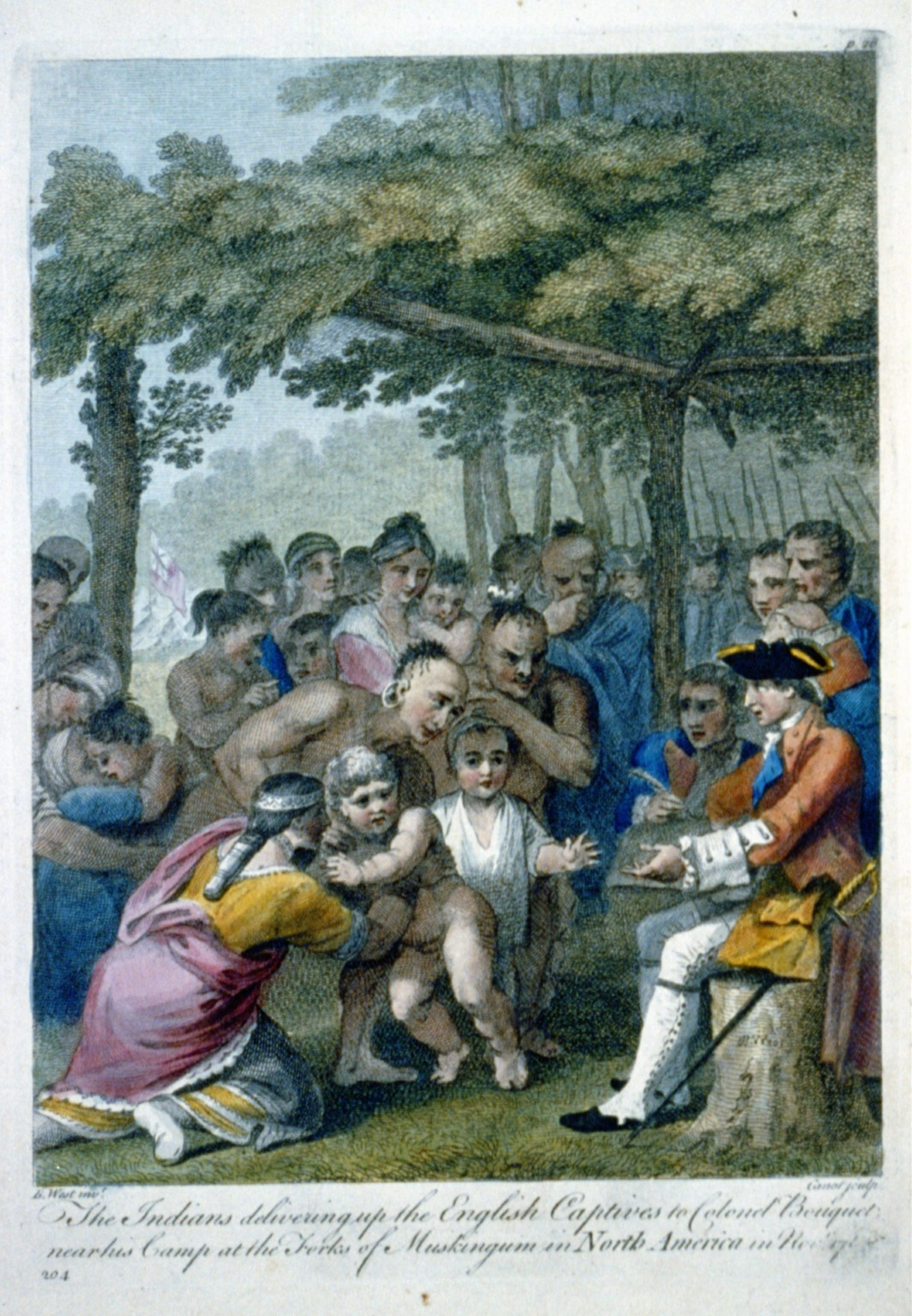
English captives being handed over to Colonel Henry Bouquet in November, 1764.

Captives taken during the raid were escorted back to Kittanning, a Lenape community that served as a staging area for raids on Pennsylvania settlements. Captain Jacobs told the Flemings that captives would be resettled as slaves among Native American communities sympathetic to the French in the Ohio Country, but some captives were taken to Canada and sold to the French there. At least one captive is known to have escaped near Oswego, New York in September, 1756. Three captives were released by the Lenape chief Tamaqua at the Lancaster Council of August 1762, and several others were handed over to Colonel Henry Bouquet at his camp on the Muskingum River in November 1764.

=== William and Elizabeth Fleming ===
William and Elizabeth Fleming survived the massacre and were captured but managed to escape. In 1756, they published an account in Boston, describing their experiences. In this account, the Flemings state that William heard the warning issued by Patrick Burns, and immediately rode off to collect his pregnant wife and flee. He was ambushed by warriors on the way, however, and was captured. One warrior identified himself as Captain Jacobs, the leader of the assault, and he told Fleming to lead him to "those Houses that were Most defenceless; and added...that he would Spare my Life on Condition I would help." Fleming then informed them that he was concerned for the safety of his wife, at which point Captain Jacobs said that, if Fleming led them to her, they would spare her life. He agreed, hoping that as they approached the settlement, his neighbors might rescue him. After taking Elizabeth Fleming captive, the Indians ransacked the Flemings' home and set fire to it, then did the same to a neighbor's home, forcing William and Elizabeth to carry bags of items they had looted from the homes.

That night, at a campfire, Captain Jacobs informed the Flemings that the Indians had learned during the failed Braddock Expedition, that General Edward Braddock "had threatned to destroy all the Indians on the Continent, after they had conquered the French, and they were informed by the French, the Pennsylvanians, Marylanders and Virginians had laid the same Plot." Jacobs added that the French "had often assured the Indians it was no Sin to destroy Hereticks, and all the English were such," and that the Indians would not "abuse" (rape) his wife, as they believed that this would bring bad luck. After the warriors fell asleep, the Flemings managed to escape, but got separated in the darkness. William eventually reached the burning houses of Great Cove, then went on to Conococheague settlement, where he found 300 Pennsylvania militia, under the command of Hance Hamilton, preparing to pursue the Indians. Elizabeth describes her escape, stating that she managed to reach Great Cove but found it abandoned and in flames. Several times she came close to Indians but managed to avoid detection by hiding. After three days wandering through the devastated community, she was found by a group of settlers and taken to one of their homes at Conococheague settlement, where she was reunited with William.

=== Charles Stuart ===
Charles Stuart was captured during the massacre and held prisoner until 1757. On his return to Pennsylvania, he wrote a lengthy statement of his experiences, probably intended for military authorities. The manuscript was published in 1926.

Stuart and his wife, son and daughter were captured at Great Cove. In his account, he misidentifies the date of the massacre as 29 October, but provides a detailed account of his experiences. He states that his home was attacked by "Delaware, Mingo and Shawnese" warriors "about 90 in number," who looted and burned his house and barn. Stuart says that Shingas led the attack on Great Cove, while Captain Jacobs and his warriors attacked the Conolloways. The warriors took Stuart with his family to join a crowd of "19 other prisoners." A few of the older captives were killed, then the warriors escorted their captives and a large number of cattle and horses west towards Kittanning. On the journey, some prisoners were given away at several native villages. Two captives escaped by killing a guard, and the warriors threatened to kill Stuart in retaliation, but Shingas interceded on his behalf.

Stuart reports a historically significant conversation with Shingas, who stated that he would have supported the British against the French, until hearing from General Braddock that "the English Should Inhabit & Inherit the Land [and]...that No Savage Should Inherit the Land." When Shingas threatened to withdraw his warriors and his support, "Gen'l Braddock answered that he did not need their Help." Shingas told Stuart he would be willing to support the British and live in peace if they would send weavers and blacksmiths to teach the Lenape to make cloth, gunpowder, and guns, and how to smelt lead and iron from ore.

The Stuarts were taken to Kittanning where Charles was forced to run the gauntlet. The next day they were given to a Wyandot chief and sent to Fort Duquesne. The Wyandots then took the family to Fort Sandusky, and along the way Stuart's two children were given to native families. Stuart and his wife were then taken to Detroit, where they were sold to two French priests. Although the Stuarts were told that they could work to pay for their freedom, they were eventually sent to England in a prisoner exchange, and returned to Pennsylvania in 1757.

== Aftermath ==
Following the massacre, most of the settlers returned to Great Cove and the Conolloways. Raids continued on isolated homesteads, and on 24 November, 11 Moravian missionaries were killed in the Gnadenhütten massacre. On 10 and 11 December, the Northampton massacre resulted in the deaths of as many as 89 settlers. By spring 1755, many small privately built forts had been constructed to protect settlers during raids, including Fort McCord in the Conococheague settlement, which was attacked and destroyed in April, 1756.

The Great Cove Massacre and other attacks on Pennsylvania settlements prompted the provincial government to construct a chain of forts across the western frontier, and a second line of forts to serve as supply centers and a "fall back" line of defense, including Fort Augusta, Fort Halifax and Fort Hunter. Fort Lyttleton was built to the north of Great Cove and Fort Loudoun just to the east. However, the unexpected destruction of the newly built Fort Granville in August, 1756 suggested that the forts themselves were vulnerable, and by then it had become clear that they were expensive to supply and garrison. The destruction of Kittanning in September, 1756 demonstrated that the colonists were capable of retaliation, and the Native American raids became much less frequent after the Treaty of Easton in 1758.

== Memorialization ==
Many victims of the massacre were buried at the Big Spring Graveyard in Ayr Township near McConnellsburg in Fulton County, Pennsylvania. A historical marker erected in 1988 by the Pennsylvania Historical and Museum Commission notes their graves:

"Among those buried here are victims of the Great Cove Massacre of Nov. 1, 1755, at present McConnellsburg. The raid was conducted by Delawares and Shawnees led by Shingas, the Delaware "king." Houses were burned, and about 50 settlers were killed or captured. Its revelation at a meeting of Pennsylvania's Provincial Council, Nov. 5, 1755, led Gov. R.H. Morris to ask the Assembly for increased frontier protection."

== See also ==
- Penn's Creek Massacre
- Battle of Sideling Hill
- Captain Jacobs
- French and Indian War
