= Fort Lyttleton (Pennsylvania) =

Fort in colonial Pennsylvania, USA

- Dublin Township, Fulton County, Pennsylvania, USA

Site information
- Type: Fort

Location
- Location of Fort Lyttleton in Pennsylvania
- Coordinates: 40°3′46″N 77°57′49″W

Site history
- Built: 1756
- In use: 1756-1763
- Battles/wars: French and Indian War; Pontiac's Rebellion

Garrison information
- Past commanders: Captain Hance Hamilton; George Croghan
- Garrison: 25-225 troops

Pennsylvania Historical Marker
- Designated: 1924

Fort Lyttleton (also spelled Lyttelton and Littleton) was a militia stockade located in the colonial Province of Pennsylvania. Its site was about a mile from Fort Littleton, Pennsylvania, near Dublin Township, in what is now Fulton County, Pennsylvania. Active from 1755 until 1763, the stockade was initially garrisoned by 75 Pennsylvania troops but at times had as many as 225. It was in use until 1759, then abandoned and reoccupied briefly in 1763 during Pontiac's War.

== Construction ==
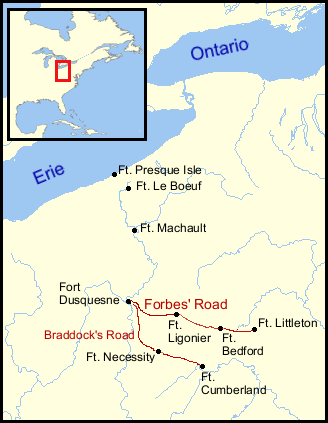
Location of Fort Lyttleton (spelled Littleton here) at the easternmost end of the Forbes Road.

Fort Lyttleton was one of four forts constructed following General Edward Braddock's defeat on July 9, 1755, at the Battle of the Monongahela. At the beginning of the French and Indian War, Braddock's defeat left Pennsylvania without a professional military force. Lenape chiefs Shingas and Captain Jacobs launched dozens of Shawnee and Delaware raids against British colonial settlements, killing and capturing hundreds of colonists and destroying settlements across western and central Pennsylvania. In late 1755, Colonel John Armstrong wrote to Governor Robert Hunter Morris: "I am of the opinion that no other means of defense than a chain of blockhouses along or near the south side of the Kittatinny Mountains from the Susquehanna to the temporary line, can secure the lives and property of the inhabitants of this country, the new settlements being all fled except Shearman's Valley." Construction was begun in December 1755.

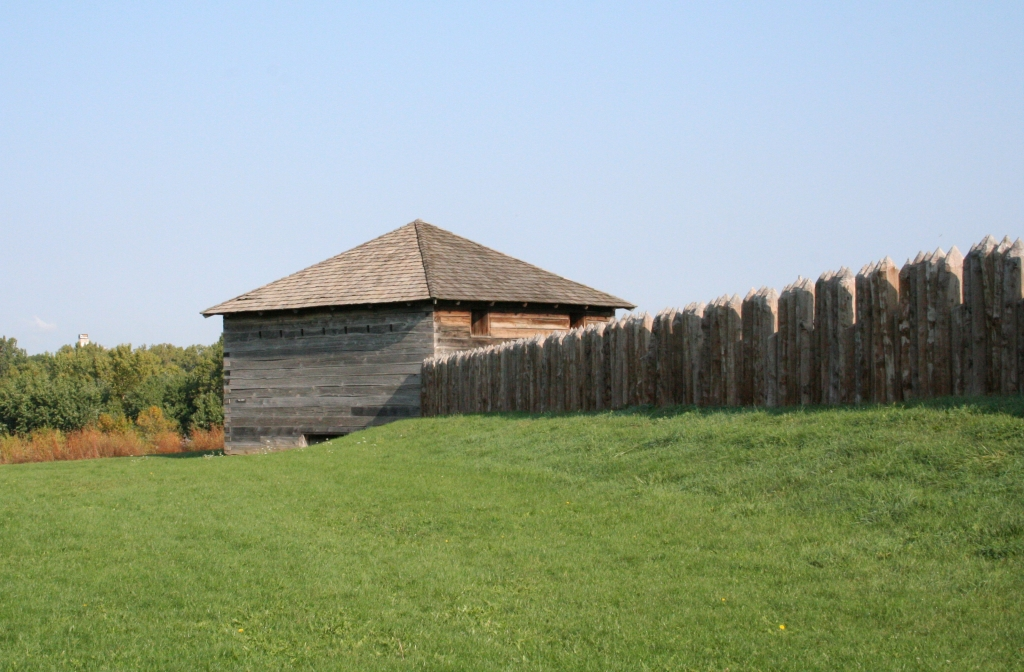
Reconstructed blockhouse and stockade similar in appearance to Fort Lyttleton

On February 9, 1756, Governor Morris wrote to General William Shirley:

For the defense of our western frontier I have caused four forts to be built beyond the Kittochtinny Hills. One stands on the new road toward the Ohio opened by this Province, and about twenty miles from the settlement. I have called it Fort Lyttleton in honor of my friend, Sir George Lyttleton. The road will not only protect the inhabitants of that region, but being upon a road which in a few miles joins General Braddock's route, coming from Cumberland, Maryland...it will prevent the march of any regulars that may enter the Province, and at the same time, serve as an advance post or magazine to the westward. I have placed a garrison of seventy-five men at each of these forts and ordered them to range the woods each way.

Governor Morris ordered George Croghan to construct these forts under the direction of Colonel Armstrong. Aside from Fort Lyttleton, construction began on Fort Morris in Shippensburg, Fort Loudoun, and Carlisle Fort. At the time, Croghan lived on upper Aughwick Creek and was also able to supervise the construction of Fort Granville and Fort Shirley. Governor Morris named Fort Lyttleton after Sir George Lyttleton, British Chancellor of the Exchequer (1709–1773).

The fort was located near a Native American village known as Sugar Cabins, at the eastern end of the Forbes Road and close to a well-traveled Native American trail leading from central Pennsylvania to the Ohio Country, with the intent that the fort would serve to monitor the passing of Indians engaged in trading as well as any war parties.

According to a plan now located in the British Library, the fort was a 100-foot square stockade with bastions at the four corners, and 8 buildings inside, including four barracks, an officers' quarters, a gunpowder magazine, and two "stone buildings," probably a kitchen and a storehouse. The Reverend Thomas Barton, an army chaplain who was stationed at Fort Loudoun, described Fort Lyttleton in a letter on July 21, 1758: "This Fort is a regular & well-plan'd Square Stockade of 126 Feet."

== Military history ==
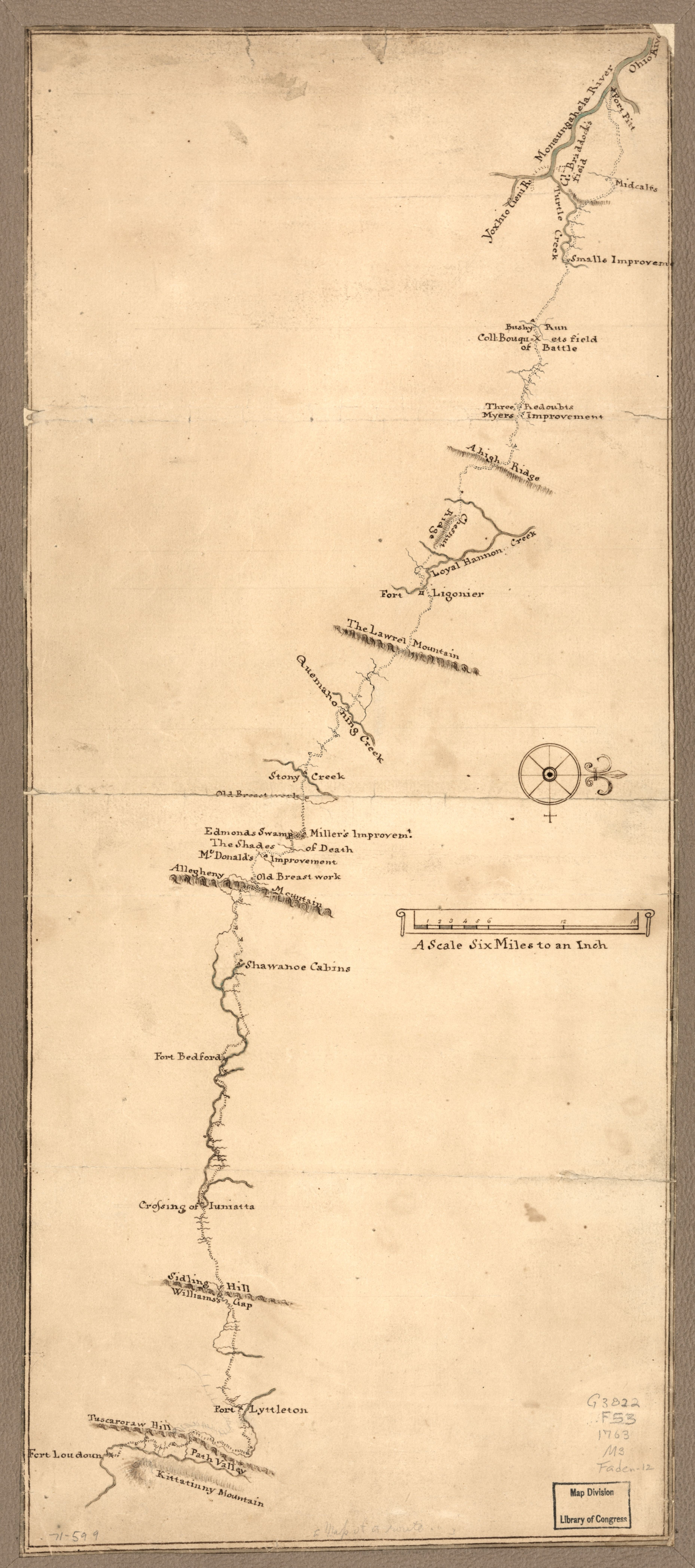
1763 map of a route through southwest Pennsylvania from Fort Loudoun, Franklin County to Fort Pitt, Pittsburgh. Fort Lyttleton is shown near the bottom of the page.

1770 map of the Province of Pennsylvania showing Fort Littleton in the map's left lower quadrant

The fort's first commander was Captain Hance Hamilton (1721–1772), who arrived soon after the capture and destruction of Fort McCord on April 1, 1756. On April 2, Captain Hamilton, together with Captain Chambers and Captain Culbertson, led a rescue force, which encountered Lenape reinforcements led by Shingas and suffered a number of casualties at the Battle of Sideling Hill. Captain Culbertson was killed, and his surviving troops retreated to Fort Lyttleton. Soon after this, Elisha Salter, Commissary General, visited Carlisle and found the civilian populace abandoning their settlements in terror, after a series of brutal raids by Lenape and Shawnee warriors. He wrote to Governor Morris: "Upon my arrival here, I found the people in the greatest confusion, the troops abandoning the forts and the country people gathering in the greatest consternation...I have prevailed on the people...to escort me to Fort Littleton." The construction of four stronghold forts and several smaller secondary forts along the western Pennsylvania frontier provided some stability, although the destruction of Fort Granville in August raised fears that the forts were too far apart and too difficult to supply.

In September, Armstrong led the Kittanning Expedition, rescuing 11 captives and killing the feared warrior Captain Jacobs. Colonel Armstrong stopped for several days at Fort Lyttleton on his return from the Kittanning Expedition. Captain Hugh Mercer was wounded during the fighting at Kittanning and was separated from the other troops. His return journey took two weeks before he "lay down, giving up all hopes of ever getting home." A "company of Cherokee Indians in kings pay" found him and carried him to Fort Lyttleton, where he recovered.

By 1757, Fort Lyttleton began to attract Cherokee Indians seeking to support British troops as auxiliaries and also spies. In June 1757, Armstrong received reports that "a large Reinforcement of French and Indians from Canada & Mississippi" at Fort Duquesne "wou'd...endeavor to cutt off the back Inhabitants." Cherokees then informed Armstrong that they had seen "a large Body of French and Indians, and a great Number of Carriages & Horses" at Fort Duquesne; and that on June 10 an enemy force was following Braddock's road toward Fort Cumberland. Colonel John Stanwix, evidently concerned that Fort Loudoun would not withstand an assault, "dispatched off 2 Companies of Col. Armstrong's Battalion to Fort Littleton with orders to destroy it & bring away all the Provisions & Stores to Fort Loudoun." This order was evidently not obeyed, and on June 28, Stanwix wrote to Armstrong that he had "augmented the Garrison at Fort Lyttleton, 150 Men."

The fort was later used as one of the supply forts along the Forbes Road in the successful 1758 Forbes Expedition to capture Fort Duquesne. The fort was abandoned in July 1759, during the construction of Fort Pitt.

In June 1763, George Croghan raised a volunteer company of 25 men to re-occupy the fort in response to Pontiac's War. The fort saw no action and Colonel Henry Bouquet, marching from Carlisle in late July, found the fort abandoned. The fort was in ruins by 1764.

== Archaeology ==
In August 2013, forty shovel test pits, each 50 centimeters square, were dug in the area behind the 1924 historical marker, where local residents have found part of a 4.5 centimeter swivel gun believed to have been used at Fort Lyttleton. Test pits were also dug on an adjacent property where a tavern, a blacksmith shop and a wheelwright's shop are thought to have stood. Future digs will focus on the 4.9-acre plot owned by the Archaeological Conservancy where the fort was located.

== Legacy ==
In 1767, the town of Fort Lyttleton (later renamed Fort Littleton) was established near the fort's former location.

In 1924, a historical marker was erected on the site of the fort by the Pennsylvania Historical Commission and the Fulton County Historical Society. In 1967, a second marker was erected in Dublin Township by the Pennsylvania Historical and Museum Commission, but in 2023 it was reported missing.

== See also ==
- Fort Augusta
- Fort Halifax
- Fort Granville
- Fort McCord
- Pennsylvania forts in the French and Indian War
