= Hansfield Garvin Hamilton Jr. =

Soldier in colonial Pennsylvania

Hansfield "Hance" Garvin Hamilton, Jr.
- Born: ca. 1721; Ireland
- Died: February 2, 1772 (aged 51); Menallen Township, Adams County, Pennsylvania
- Burial place: Gettysburg, Pennsylvania
- Military career
- Allegiance: Great Britain
- Branch: British Army: Pennsylvania Regiment
- Service years: 1755-1759
- Rank: Lieutenant Colonel
- Commands: Fort Lyttleton
- Conflicts: French and Indian War; Battle of Sideling Hill; Kittanning Expedition

Hansfield "Hance" Garvin Hamilton Jr. (ca. 1721 - February 2, 1772) was a Pennsylvania colonist and soldier active during the French and Indian War. In 1749, he was elected the first sheriff of York County, and was later a judge. He was known for his leadership during a period when Pennsylvania settlers were threatened by attacks from French-allied Native American war parties, and was commander of Fort Lyttleton. He was eventually promoted to lieutenant colonel.

== Birth and early life ==
Hamilton was born in Derry, Ireland, probably before 1721. (Note: His birth date is uncertain, and is often recorded as 1721, however records also show that he purchased land soon after arriving in Wrightsville, Pennsylvania in 1732, which would not have been possible for an 11-year-old. One researcher believes that his original headstone showed a birthdate of 1711, and was rendered illegible. A new headstone was made with a speculative birthdate of 1721. This, in turn, raises the question of his father's age, as Hance Hamilton Sr. is usually listed with a birthdate of either 1695 or 1700. Additional confusion is due to the fact that there are at least four persons known as "Hance Hamilton.") In August 1729 his father, Hansfield Garvin Hamilton Sr., led 140 families to emigrate from Ireland to New Castle, Delaware, at the invitation of William Penn's sons, Thomas Penn and Richard Penn Sr. They settled in what was then Lancaster County, Pennsylvania, near present-day Gettysburg. This community later came to be known as Hamiltonban Township, Pennsylvania. Hance Hamilton Jr. arrived in North America in 1732, accompanied by his older brother James. He moved to the Marsh Creek settlement in 1739. In May 1742, his name was listed on a road-building crew that built a 30-mile road from Walnut Bottom across Yellow Breeches Creek to Nathan Hussey's Ferry near Goldsboro, Pennsylvania.

== Legal career ==
In 1749, Hamilton ran for sheriff of York County against Richard McAllister, who was supported by the Dutch immigrant community. There was a riot as Irish voters attempted to prevent Dutch and German voters from reaching the ballot-box. McAllister was declared the winner, but Hamilton contested the results in court, and was commissioned as sheriff by Governor James Hamilton. In September 1749, he was commissioned as a judge and Justice of the Peace, and this commission was renewed in 1751. He was re-elected Sheriff in 1752, and recommissioned by Governor Robert Hunter Morris in 1755. Following his military service from 1755 to 1759, he was reappointed, on April 23, 1761, as Justice of the Peace and Judge of the York County Court of Common Pleas.

== Military career ==
Following Braddock's defeat in July 1755, Hamilton raised a company of militia. He was among the first to respond to the Great Cove massacre in November, 1755, arriving at McDowell's Mill with 200 men to rescue survivors and to round up scattered livestock.

In January 1756 he was commissioned captain of Provincial troops. In February 1756, he was placed in command of Fort Lyttleton, arriving on April 1, soon after Lenape warriors captured and burned Fort McCord, taking 27 settlers prisoner. On April 2, three companies of militia under the joint command of Captain Hamilton, together with Captain Chambers and Captain Culbertson, went in pursuit of the warriors and encountered Lenape reinforcements led by Shingas. In a two-hour engagement at the Battle of Sideling Hill, both sides suffered heavy casualties. Captain Culbertson was killed, and his surviving troops retreated to Fort Lyttleton. Hamilton was the first to report on the battle and on those killed.

In September 1756, Hamilton was a company commander in Armstrong's Kittanning Expedition. After returning to Fort Lyttleton following the raid, Hamilton sent "a company of Cherokee Indians in kings pay" back along the trail to see if the Lenape were in pursuit, and to look for surviving colonial troops who had fallen behind. They found Captain Hugh Mercer, injured and exhausted, who had decided to "lay down, giving up all hopes of ever getting home." Mercer was carried to Fort Lyttleton, where he recovered.

In October 1757, Hamilton was involved in an effort to persuade soldiers, whose term of enlistment was ending, not to leave military service. This effort was successful, and he received a monetary reward of £59, 3s, 8d. On December 6, 1757, Hamilton was promoted to major, and on May 31, 1758, he was commissioned lieutenant colonel, First Battalion, Pennsylvania Regiment of foot.

In September and October 1758, Hamilton was arrested three times. The full details of these incidents are unknown, as only part of the correspondence has survived, but it appears that on September 13, Hamilton struck an artificer sergeant during a dispute. Hamilton apologized to Colonel Henry Bouquet, and no action was taken. On September 29, Hamilton was again arrested, although the reasons for this are unknown. In October, Hamilton used insulting language in a dispute with Bouquet himself, apparently while intoxicated, and took a sword from another officer. Bouquet ordered a court-martial, but canceled the order after Hamilton apologized, writing on October 19: "I was wrong, & hope from Colonel Bouquet's Honor, that this Acknowledgment may engage him to consider all the Incidents of that night as the effects of too Liberal a Glass...even next morning I remembered very little of what passed the night before."

Hamilton resigned from military service in March, 1759.

== Later life and family ==
Little is known of Hamilton's life following his military service. In 1761 he was appointed Justice of the Peace and Judge of the York County Court of Common Pleas by Governor James Hamilton. Records show that he was a trustee for the Upper Marsh Creek Church in Cumberland Township in May 1765, when he and other trustees applied for a warrant for one hundred acres to be used by the church.

Hance Hamilton had seven sons: George, William, James, John, Hance Garvin Jr., and Thomas. He had four daughters: May, Mary, Harriet, and Sarah.

== Death and burial ==
He signed his will on January 27, 1772 and died four days later on February 2, in Menallen Township, in Adams County, Pennsylvania, at the age of 51. His six slaves were sold at public auction in 1773. His remains were first interred in Black's Graveyard, on Upper Marsh Creek, and were moved in 1848 to Evergreen Cemetery, in Gettysburg. His original headstone was cracked and nearly illegible, so a new one was made, with a possibly incorrect birthdate.
