= Captain Jacobs =

Lenape chief

Tewea, better known by his English name Captain Jacobs, (d. September 8, 1756) was a Lenape chief during the French and Indian War. Jacobs received his English name from a Pennsylvanian settler named Arthur Buchanan, who thought the chief resembled a "burly German in Cumberland County."

== British colonial settlement ==
Lewistown, Pennsylvania is located where there once was a considerable Lenape settlement, at the confluence of the Kishacoquillas Creek and the Juniata River. It was in 1754 that British colonists, led by Buchanan, came to the area. Captain Jacobs, being a Lenape chief, was at first reluctant to sell any of the nearby land to the colonists. With the assistance of a keg of rum, a few trinkets, and some tobacco, Buchanan convinced Jacobs to give them the land. Captain Jacobs initially professed great friendship toward the British, but was swayed by the French to think otherwise. As the number of British colonists grew, so did Jacobs' dissatisfaction with them. Without notice or incident, the Lenape destroyed their own settlement and left the area, which the colonists noted with caution.

== French and Indian War ==
During the French and Indian War, Jacobs led Lenape warriors against British colonial settlements in multiple raids following Braddock's defeat throughout the valleys of Central Pennsylvania. Jacobs boasted that he "could take any fort that would catch fire, and would make peace with the English when they had learned him to make gunpowder." Jacobs led warriors during the Great Cove massacre in November 1755, and raided Fort McCord in April 1756, burning it to the ground and taking 27 civilian captives. Three days later, at the Battle of Sideling Hill, his warriors defeated a company of Pennsylvania militia that was sent to rescue the captives, killing their commanding officer. He participated in the burning of Fort Granville under the direction of the French commander. The Pennsylvania Provincial Council took months to organize an expedition in hopes of neutralizing both Shingas and Captain Jacobs.

== Kittanning Expedition ==
On the morning of September 8, 1756, Colonel John Armstrong Sr. led a force of 307 Pennsylvanian provincial troops to attack the Lenape village of Kittanning in hopes of disrupting raids against frontier settlements. Chief Shingas was away during the battle, so Jacobs took command and fought Armstrong's men from his log cabin with his wife assisting him. Hugh Gibson, who was a captive at Kittanning at that time, reports that when Armstrong's men threatened to set fire to his house if Jacobs would not surrender, Jacobs replied that "he could eat fire."

Gibson also asserts that Jacobs killed fourteen of Armstrong's men, adding that "In this contest, Jacobs received seven balls (bullets) before he was brought upon his knees." One of Armstrong's soldiers, (either John Ferguson or possibly Lieutenant Robert Callender) managed to set fire to Jacobs' house. Jacobs and his family remained inside until the magazine exploded. When they emerged, Jacobs' spouse was killed first, followed by Jacobs himself, and then their son. Captain Jacobs was scalped and his head carried back to Philadelphia where Armstrong received 600 pounds in bounty for it.

In January 1758 Pennsylvania proprietor Thomas Penn wrote to Richard Peters mentioning the Kittanning Expedition, and adding that "I also received...the scalp of Captain Jacobs for which I am greatly obliged to Colonel Armstrong to whom it's a valuable trophy. I have thought of sending it to the British Museum with a plate engraved giving an account of the action." It is unknown what happened to the scalp.

== See also ==
- Kittanning (village)
- Kittanning Expedition
- Tamaqua (Lenape chief)
- Pisquetomen
- Nenatcheehunt
