= Kittanning Expedition =

1756 expedition of the French and Indian War

- Part of the French and Indian War
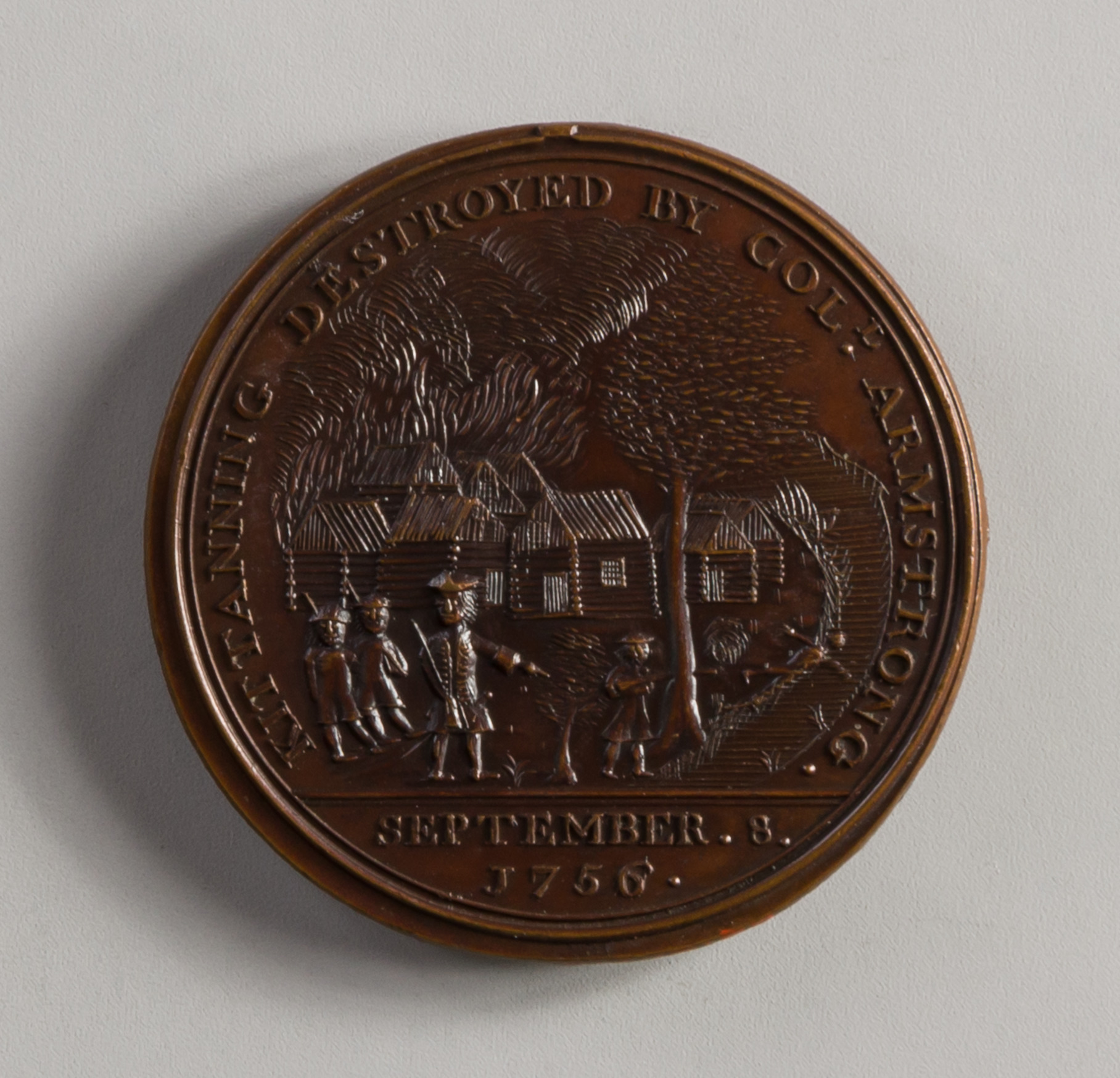
- Medal issued to commemorate Kittanning's destruction
Date	September 8, 1756
Location	Kittanning, Lenapehoking
Result	Pennsylvanian victory

Belligerents
Pennsylvania	Lenape

Commanders and leaders
John Armstrong Sr.	Captain Jacobs †

Strength
300 provincials	Unknown

Casualties and losses
17 killed 13 wounded 19 missing	9 killed

The Kittanning Expedition (also known as the Armstrong Expedition or the Battle of Kittanning) was a raid carried out during the French and Indian War on September 8, 1756, against the Lenapehoking village of Kittanning, which had served as a staging point for attacks by Lenape warriors against white colonists in the British Province of Pennsylvania. Carried out by 300 provincial troops under Lieutenant-colonel John Armstrong Sr., the raid resulted Kittanning's destruction. Carried out deep into hostile territory, it was the only major expedition carried out by Pennsylvanian provincial troops during the war.

== Background ==
Although it eventually became a worldwide conflict known as the Seven Years' War, the French and Indian War began on the Pennsylvania frontier as a struggle for control of the Ohio Country. With the surrender of George Washington at Fort Necessity in 1754 and Braddock's defeat in 1755, the settlers on the Pennsylvania frontier were without professional military protection, and scrambled to organize a defense.

The French-allied Indians who had defeated General Edward Braddock at the Monongahela were primarily from the Great Lakes region to the north. The local Indians, mostly Lenape and Shawnee who had migrated to the area after white colonists had settled their lands to the east, had waited to see who would win the contest—they could not risk siding with the loser. With Fort Duquesne now secured, the victorious French encouraged the Lenape and Shawnee to "take up the hatchet" against those who had taken their land.

Beginning about October 1755, Lenape and Shawnee war parties, often with French cooperation, began raiding settlements in Pennsylvania. Although European-Americans also waged war with cruelty, they found Indian warfare particularly brutal and frightening. Notable among the Indian raiders were the Lenape chiefs Shingas and Captain Jacobs, both of whom lived at Kittanning which also served as a staging area for raids and a temporary holding center for captives. Following the massacres of mostly unarmed settlers at Draper's Meadow, Penn's Creek, Great Cove, and Gnadenhütten in 1755, the colonial governments of Pennsylvania and Virginia offered rewards for their scalps.

Captain Jacobs was on an expedition led by François Coulon de Villiers that descended on Fort Granville (near present-day Lewistown) on the morning of August 2, 1756. The attackers were held off, but the garrison commander was killed, and his second in command surrendered the garrison, including the women and children, the next morning. Armstrong, the commander's brother, immediately organized an expedition against Kittanning in response.

== Expedition ==
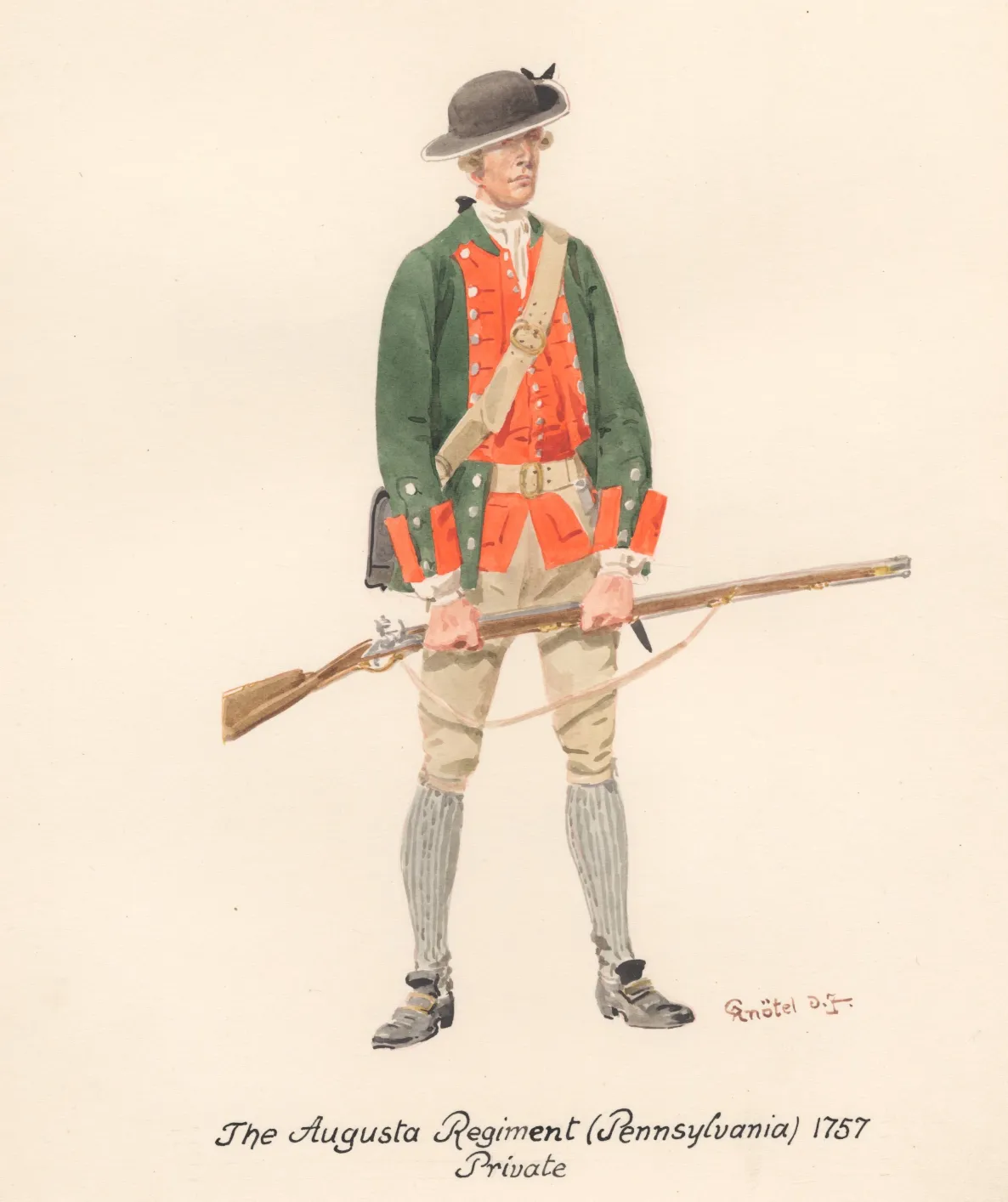
A Pennsylvanian provincial soldier in 1757

Armstrong led 300 Pennsylvania provincial soldiers from Fort Shirley on August 31. By September 7, the column had reached the vicinity of Kittanning. Signs of a small Indian camp prompted Colonel Armstrong to detach a dozen men under Lieutenant James Hogg to monitor it while the column moved on toward the village. The next morning Armstrong launched a surprise attack on the village. Many of the Kittanning residents fled, but Captain Jacobs put up a defense, holing up with his wife and family inside their home. When he refused to surrender, Lieutenant Robert Callender set his house and others on fire, touching off gunpowder that had been stored inside. Some buildings exploded, and pieces of Indian bodies flew high into the air and landed in a nearby cornfield. Captain Jacobs was killed and scalped after jumping from his home in an attempt to escape the flames.

The battle ended when the entire village was engulfed in flames. Prisoners informed Armstrong that a party of 24 men had left the day before in advance of another planned raid. This news caused Armstrong some concern over the fate of Lieutenant Hogg, so he precipitately ordered a withdrawal. They were met after several miles by a mortally wounded Hogg, who reported that his force had been attacked by a larger Indian force. Some of his men had immediately fled, and most of the rest had been killed. Armstrong and his remaining force marched to Fort Lyttleton to rest. By September 13, they had returned to Fort Loudoun. According to Armstrong's report, he took 11 scalps and freed 11 prisoners, mostly women and children. He estimated that his men killed between 30 and 40 Indians. Many of the white captives (including Marie Le Roy and Barbara Leininger and Hugh Gibson) who were not rescued were ferried across the Allegheny River in canoes, then taken by foot over trails into Ohio, where they were assimilated into the tribes. Many were not rescued until Henry Bouquet brought them back from Ohio to Pennsylvania in 1764.

== Aftermath ==
After the destruction of the town, many of its inhabitants returned and erected their wigwams on the ashes of their former homes. The town was reoccupied briefly and two of the British prisoners who had attempted to escape with Armstrong's men were tortured to death. The Indians then harvested their corn and moved to Fort Duquesne, where they requested permission from the French to resettle further to the west, away from the British colonists. According to Marie Le Roy and Barbara Leininger, many of Kittanning's inhabitants moved to Saucunk, Kuskusky or Muskingum.

Historian Fred Anderson notes that equivalent raids by Indians on Pennsylvania villages were usually labeled "massacres", and that the Indians considered the expedition to be one. The destruction of Kittanning was hailed as a victory in Pennsylvania, and Armstrong was known afterwards as the "Hero of Kittanning". He and his men collected the "scalp bounty" that had been placed on Captain Jacobs. However, the victory had limitations: the attackers suffered more casualties than they inflicted, and most of the villagers escaped, taking with them almost all of the prisoners that had been held in the village. The expedition also probably aggravated the frontier war; subsequent Indian raids that autumn were fiercer than ever. The Kittanning Expedition revealed to the village's inhabitants their vulnerability, and many moved to more secure areas. A peace faction led by Shingas's brother Tamaqua soon came to the forefront. Tamaqua eventually made peace with Pennsylvania in the Treaty of Easton, which enabled a British force under General John Forbes to successfully mount an expedition in 1758 that drove the French from Fort Duquesne.

== See also ==
- Kittanning Path
- Kittanning, Pennsylvania
- Kittanning (village)

== Sources ==
- Anderson, Fred (2000). Crucible of War: The Seven Years' War and the Fate of Empire in British North America, 1754–1766. New York: Alfred Knopf. ISBN 0-375-40642-5.
- Crytzer, Brady J. War in the Peaceable Kingdom: The Kittanning Raid of 1756. Yardley, PA: Westholme Publishing, 2016.
- Fisher, John S (1927). "Colonel John Armstrong's Expedition against Kittanning". The Pennsylvania Magazine of History and Biography. 51 (1). Historical Society of Pennsylvania: 1–14. JSTOR 20086627.
- Hunter, William A. Forts on the Pennsylvania Frontier, 1753–1758. Originally published 1960; Wennawoods reprint, 1999.
- McConnell, Michael N. A Country Between: The Upper Ohio Valley and Its Peoples, 1724–1774. Lincoln: University of Nebraska Press, 1992.
- Myers, James P. "Pennsylvania's Awakening: the Kittanning Raid of 1756." Pennsylvania History 66 (Summer 1999), pp. 399–420
- O'Meara, Walter (1965). Guns at the Forks. Englewood Cliffs, NJ: Prentice Hall. OCLC 21999143.
