= Parnell Knob =

Coordinates: 39.91792°N 77.86118°W

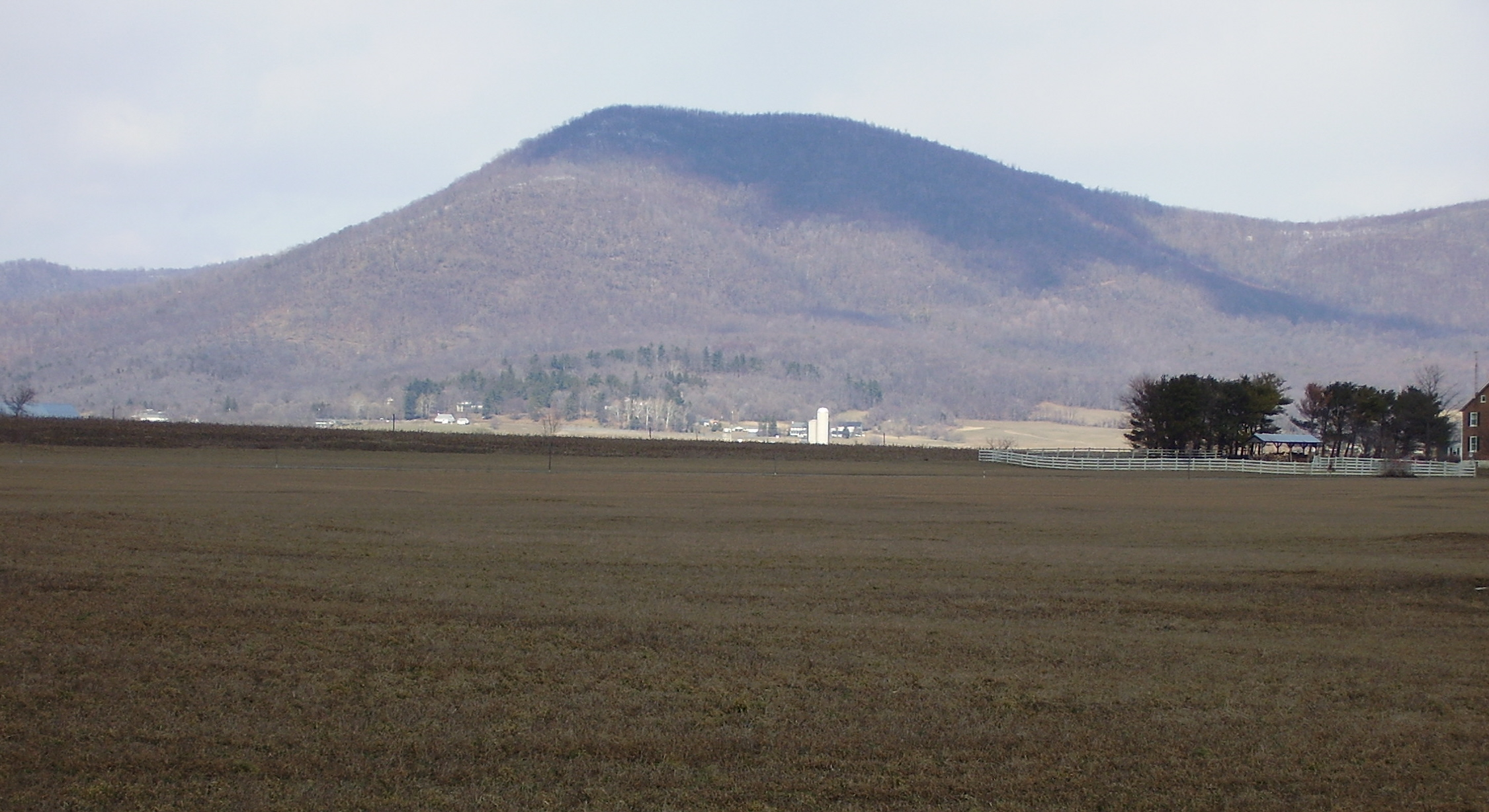
- Parnell Knob

Highest point
- Elevation: 2,021 ft (616 m)

Geography
- Location: Franklin County, Pennsylvania, U.S.
- Parent range: Appalachian Mountains
- Topo map: USGS Saint Thomas(PA) Quadrangle

Parnell Knob is a mountain in the Ridge and Valley Appalachians region of south central Pennsylvania. This knob rises above the village of St. Thomas, where Front Mountain and Broad mountain come together. It is a feature sculptured by the hard dense Tuscarora quartzite of the Silurian age. Parnell Knob is conspicuous in that it rises abruptly above the relatively level Great Appalachian Valley.
