= Treaty of Easton =

1758 conference attended by British colonists and various Native American nations

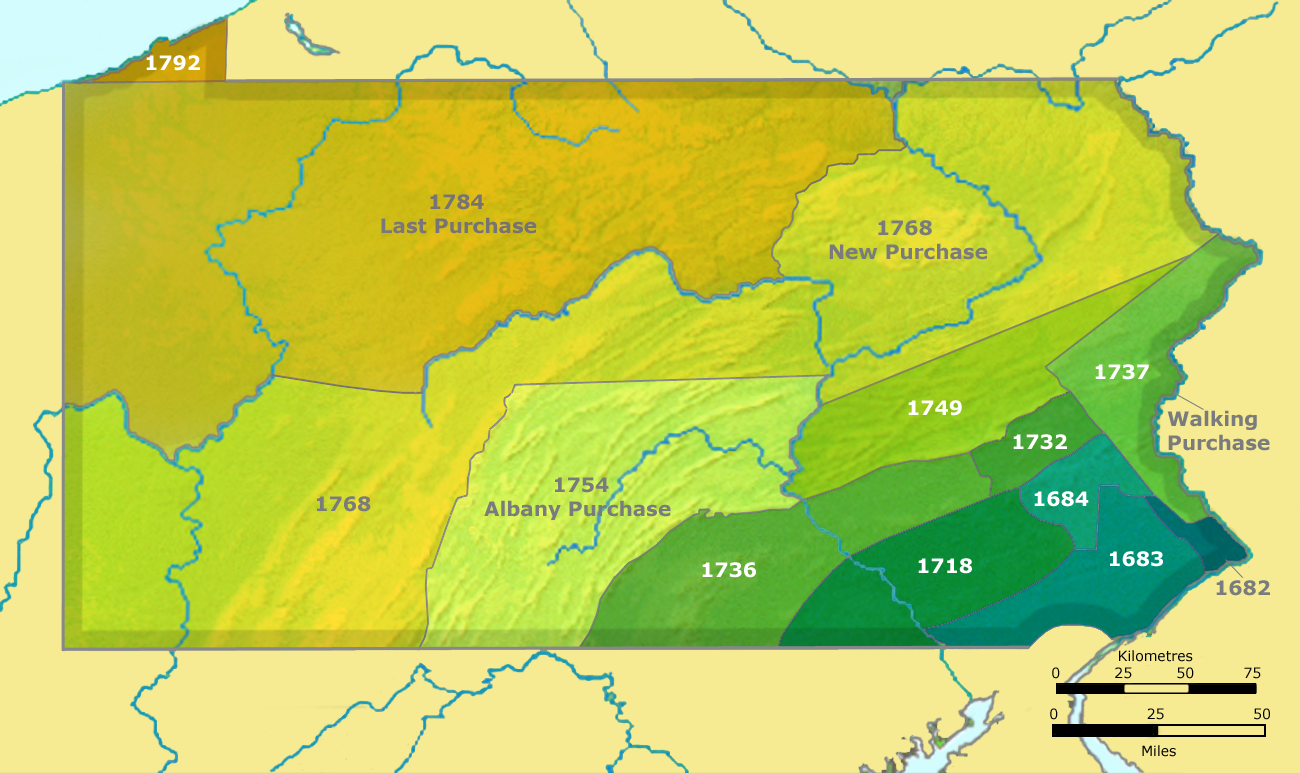
Land purchases from the Lenape and Haudenosaunee in Pennsylvania (1682-1792)

The Treaty of Easton was a series of meetings held at Easton, Pennsylvania, from 7 to 26 October 1758, involving the governments of Pennsylvania and New Jersey, and representatives of the Haudenosaunee, Lenape and other Indigenous groups. The conference was one of several held at Easton beginning in 1756. As a result of the 1758 conference, Pennsylvania agreed to return all of the land west of the Allegheny Mountains that it had acquired in the 1754 Albany Purchase, thus eliminating a major reason for Lenape raids during the French and Indian War.

== Background ==
In 1754, at the Albany Congress, the Haudenosaunee agreed to sell to Pennsylvania a huge tract of land west of the Susquehanna River. The Haudenosaunee, who maintained they had authority over the Lenape by “right of conquest," agreed to the sale without consulting the western Lenape whose villages on the Allegheny River and its tributaries lay within the territory sold. Anger over this purchase, combined with the July 1755 defeat of the Braddock Expedition at the Battle of the Monongahela, contributed to the western Lenape's decision to attack Pennsylvania's frontier settlements. Within a few months, the eastern Lenape who lived along the North Branch of the Susquehanna River, many of whom had been affected by the 1737 Walking Purchase, also began raiding. Notable among the attacks were the Great Cove massacre, the Penn's Creek massacre and the attack on the Moravian mission settlement of Gnadenhütten on the Lehigh River. In response, the Pennsylvania government declared war on the Lenape in April 1756 and offered a scalp bounty.

In July 1756, Teedyuscung, the spokesperson for the eastern Lenape, "put down the hatchet" and met with Pennsylvania's lieutenant governor Robert Hunter Morris in Easton. In November, Teedyuscung, who styled himself "King of the Delawares," met with the new lieutenant governor William Denny. Teedyuscung claimed to speak for ten nations including the Haudenosaunee. When asked why the Lenape had gone to war, Teedyuscung answered:

This very Ground that is under me (striking it with his foot) was my Land and Inheritance, and is taken from me by Fraud; when I say this Ground, I mean all the Land lying between Tohiccon Creek and Wioming, on the River Saquehannah.

At the conference at Easton in the summer of 1757, with representatives of the Haudenosaunee in attendance, Teedyuscung again claimed to represent ten nations, and again challenged the legality of the purchases that decades earlier had forced the Lenape out of their traditional territory. Teedyuscung refused to submit the dispute to mediation and declared that he wanted King George II to decide what action to take. Despite the disagreement, Teedyuscung and Denny formalized peace between the eastern Lenape and Pennsylvania through an exchange of wampum belts.

== 1758 Easton conference ==
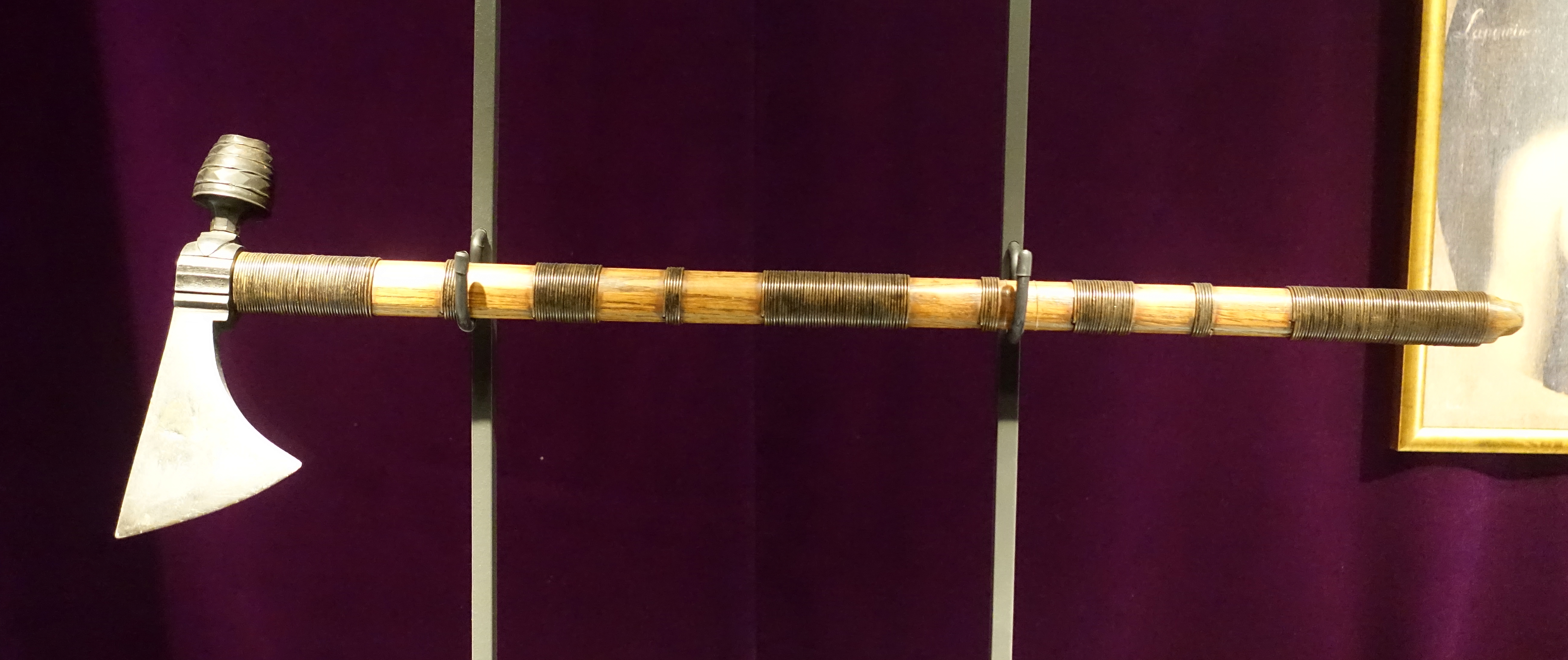
A Haudenosaunee pipe tomahawk thought to be from the 1758 Easton conference

A much larger conference was held at Easton from 7 to 26 October 1758. In attendance were Denny, Governor Francis Bernard of New Jersey, and representatives of numerous Indigenous nations. The Lenape who lived along the North Branch of the Susquehanna River were again represented by Teedyuscung. The Haudenosaunee were represented principally by leaders from the Seneca, Onondaga, and Mohawk nations. Charles Thomson, who attended the conference as Teedyuscung's secretary, reported that just over 500 Indigenous people were present. Conrad Weiser served as an interpreter. The Attorney General of Pennsylvania, Benjamin Chew, Esq. attended the negotiations and documented the proceedings in his Journal of a Journey to Easton. Thomson also wrote about the Easton negotiations in a 1759 work entitled An Enquiry into the Causes of the Alienation of the Delaware and Shawanese Indians from the British Interest, which blamed the war on the proprietors, the sons of Pennsylvania's founder William Penn.

Teedyuscung once again boasted that he was King of the Delawares and the spokesperson for ten nations. He frequently disrupted the proceedings. Richard Peters, the Pennsylvania Provincial Secretary, wrote in his diary that during one session "Teedyuscung staggered into the meeting, bottle in hand, and very drunk." Charles Thompson also recorded the incident, stating that Teedyuscung was "too drunk to do Business." A day later, the Mohawk spokesperson Nichas, fed up with Teedyuscung's boasting and frequent interruptions, angrily berated the Lenape leader. The interpreters declined to translate what was said. The representatives of the Haudenosaunee later met privately with Denny and disavowed Teedyuscung's authority to speak for them. When the conference resumed, Teedyuscung contritely listened as the minutes of the meeting with Denny were read aloud. Teedyuscung then asked the Haudenosaunee make the eastern Lenape the owners of the Lands at Wioming, Shamokin, and other places on the Susquehanna River. The Haudenosaunee delegates stated they had no authority to do so but would refer the matter to the Great Council. Teedyuscung also acknowledged that the 1749 purchase of land north of the Kittiany Ridge was "fairly sold." leaving only the Walking Purchase unresolved.

During the conference, the western Lenape sachem, Pisquetomen, arrived and delivered a message from his people indicating a willingness to discuss peace. The Easton delegates drafted and approved a letter which Pisquetomen brought back to their people. Accompanying him were the Moravian intermediary Christian Frederick Post and representatives of the Haudenosaunee and eastern Lenape. Their purpose was to communicate the results of the Easton conference and urge the western Lenape to adopt a neutral stance in the war going forward. As a result, the western Lenape did not intervene to prevent the British capture of Fort Duquesne in November 1758.

On October 20, Denny, in the name of the Proprietors, announced the restoration to the Haudenosaunee of that part of the 1754 Albany Purchase west of the Allegheny Mountains, removing a major cause of Indigenous raiding during the war.

Although the 1758 Easton conference did not conclude with the formal signing of a written treaty, it did reaffirm and renew Pennsylvania and New Jersey's peaceful relationship with the Haudenosaunee and the eastern Lenape. The conference also saw the settlement of outstanding land claims in New Jersey, and a commitment to return captives taken during the war. Finally, the conference laid the groundwork for ending the conflict with the western Lenape.

The conference concluded on October 26, 1758, and on November 16, Governor Denny announced to the Pennsylvania Assembly that "a general peace was concluded."

== Aftermath ==
The 1758 Treaty of Easton set the stage for the withdrawal of western Lenape support for the French, but the years that followed saw an incomplete effort to consolidate what the conference had accomplished. Christian Frederick Post continued diplomatic efforts to bring western Lenape into accommodation with the British, but these efforts did not produce a lasting peace. The outbreak of Pontiac's War in 1763 demonstrated the limits of the arrangements reached at Easton, as Indigenous resistance to British military occupation and colonial encroachment spread. Later that year, the Royal Proclamation of 1763 established the Appalachian Mountains as the boundary beyond which colonial settlement was prohibited without Crown authorization. The 1768 Treaty of Fort Stanwix redrew that boundary, ceding a large area to the Crown and establishing the West Branch of the Susquehanna River and the Ohio River as the boundary. By then, Lenape communities along the Allegheny River and its tributaries had already begun relocating west to the Muskingum River, while the eastern Lenape had largely relocated north along the Susquehanna and Chemung river.
