= John Armstrong Sr. =

American civil engineer and soldier

John Armstrong

Member of the Continental Congress
- In office 1779–1780

Personal details
- Born: October 13, 1717 Brookeborough, County Fermanagh, Ireland
- Died: March 9, 1795 (aged 77) Carlisle, Pennsylvania, U.S.
- Spouse: Rebecca Lyon (m. 1747)
- Children: 3, including James and John
- Parent(s): James Armstrong; Jane Campbell

Military service
- Allegiance: Great Britain; United States
- Branch/service: Pennsylvania Militia; Continental Army
- Rank: Brigadier general (Continental Army); Major general (Pennsylvania Militia)
- Battles/wars: French and Indian War; Battle of Kittanning; Forbes Expedition; American Revolutionary War; Battle of Brandywine; Battle of Germantown

John Armstrong (October 13, 1717 – March 9, 1795) was an American civil engineer and soldier who served as a brigadier general in the Continental Army and as a major general in the Pennsylvania Militia during the Revolutionary War. He was also a delegate to the Continental Congress for Pennsylvania. Armstrong County, Pennsylvania is named in his honor. As a Presbyterian he was an elder in the Old Pine Street Presbyterian Church in Philadelphia.

== Early life and family ==
Armstrong was born on October 13, 1717, in Brookeborough, County Fermanagh, Ireland, parents not determined, who married in 1704. He was one of approximately 15 children born to his parents that included: Margaret Armstrong (1737–1817), who married Rev. George Duffield (1732–1790), and Rebecca Armstrong (1738–1828), who married James Turner (1737–1803).

John was educated in Ireland and became a civil engineer before emigrating to Pennsylvania, with his brother-in-law, John Lyon, around 1740.

In 1747, Armstrong was married to Rebecca Lyon Armstrong (1719–1797), daughter of Archibald Lyon and Ann Lyon. Together, they were the parents of:

- James Armstrong (1748–1828), who married Mary Stevenson (1766–1813), daughter of George Stevenson, Esq.
- John Armstrong Jr. (1758–1843), who married Alida Livingston (1761–1822), the sister of Robert R. Livingston and Edward Livingston.

His sister, Margaret Armstrong, married George Duffield, minister in the Old Pine Street Presbyterian Church in Philadelphia where John was an elder.

== Career ==
Armstrong came to Pennsylvania as a surveyor for the Penn family, the proprietary owners of the colony. In 1750, he laid out the first plat or plan for the town of Carlisle, Pennsylvania, and was one of its first settlers. He was later appointed surveyor for the newly established Cumberland County.

=== Seven Years' War ===
In 1756, he led the Kittanning Expedition. In 1758, Colonel Armstrong led 2,700 Pennsylvania provincial troops on the Forbes expedition, the approach of which compelled the French to vacate and blow up Fort Duquesne. Armstrong became a good friend to the other militia commander in this expedition, Colonel George Washington.

James Smith wrote that in the fall of 1763, "I went on the Susquehannah campaign, against the Indians, under the command of General Armstrong. In this route we burnt the Delaware and Monsey towns, on the West Branch of the Susquehannah, and destroyed all their corn."

=== American Revolution ===
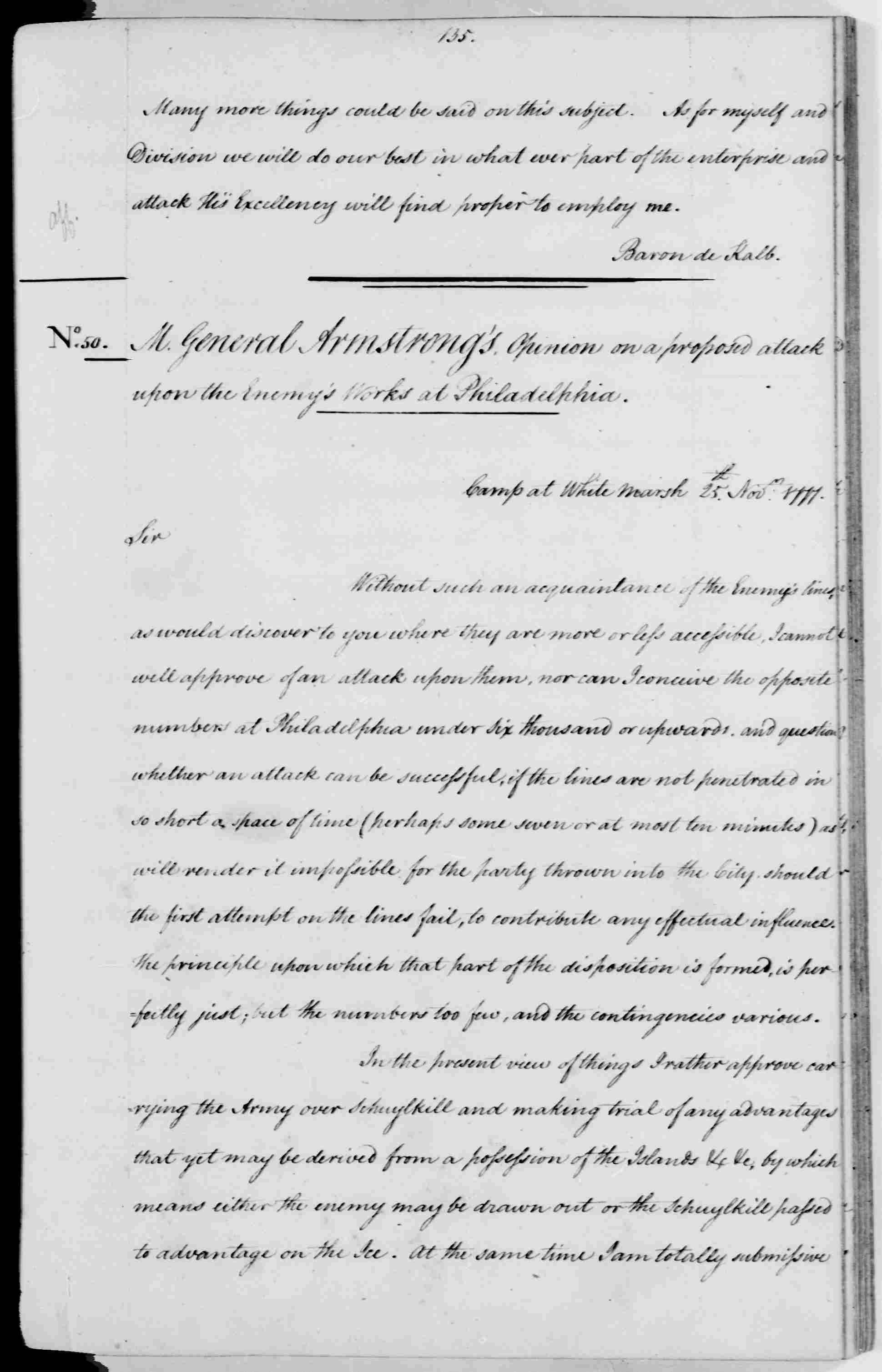
Letter from Armstrong to George Washington expressing Armstrong's opinion on proposed attack on British forces at Philadelphia, 25 November 1777

In the early stages of the American Revolutionary War, Armstrong was a brigadier general in the Pennsylvania militia. On March 1, 1776, the Continental Congress appointed him to that same rank in the Continental Army. He was sent south to begin preparations for the defense of Charleston, South Carolina. He contributed his engineering talents to the construction of defenses that enabled them to withstand the Battle of Sullivan's Island later that year. When General Charles Lee arrived to take command, he returned to his duties with the main army and with the Pennsylvania militia. Pennsylvania named him major general in charge of the state militia. This ended his service in the Continental Army, but not the war or his cooperation with General George Washington.

At the Battle of Brandywine on September 11, 1777, Armstrong's militia held the far left of the American line. They were also to guard the army's supplies. After a hard day's fighting the Americans were forced to withdraw or face being surrounded. Armstrong brought the supplies and his militia out from Pyle's Ford after dark.

In the Battle of Germantown on October 4, General Armstrong led the American right. His mission was to skirt the British left flank and attack there and in their rear. Despite delays and the troubles some units had in moving, the overall attack was going well, until the center was held up at the Benjamin Chew House. The attack then collapsed after a friendly fire incident in the fog in which General Adam Stephen's men fired on Anthony Wayne's troops causing their withdrawal. Armstrong, whose men had advanced nearly to the center of Germantown, but were not greatly involved in the fight later complained that it was "....a glorious victory fought for and eight tenths won, ....mysteriously lost, for to this moment no one man can ....give any good reason for the flight."

After Germantown, Armstrong was granted permission to give up active command. At age sixty, his health was declining, and old wounds were troubling him. He served until April 4, 1778.

=== Later life ===
After his service in the War ended, Armstrong returned home to Carlisle, where he was elected to the Continental Congress by the Pennsylvania Assembly. As a delegate from 1779 to 1780, he was a strong supporter of Washington and the army. Armstrong was firm in his support for a new United States Constitution, and was returned to the Congress of the Confederation during its final days in 1787 and 1788.

Throughout his life Armstrong served in a number of local or civic offices. One of these, the Carlisle school board, led him to originally oppose Dr. Benjamin Rush's proposal to start a college in the town. He later relented, and became a member of the first Board of Trustees for Dickinson College from 1783 to 1794. John died at home in Carlisle, Pennsylvania, on March 9, 1795, and is buried in the Old Carlisle Cemetery. In 1800, when Pennsylvania created a new county with its seat at Kittanning, it was named Armstrong County in his honor.
