= Shingas =

Lenape chief and warrior (fl. 1740–1763)

Shingas (died c. 1765) was a Lenape chief and warrior who participated in military activities in Ohio Country during the 7 Years War. Allied with the French, Shingas led numerous raids on British settlements during the war, for which he was nicknamed "Shingas the Terrible" by the settlers. The colonial governments of Pennsylvania and Virginia responded to these raids by placing a bounty on Shingas.

== Early life ==
Shingas was born and raised in the Tulpehocken Creek Valley, in Berks and Lebanon counties, on the upper Schuylkill River, with his uncle Sassoonan and his brothers. One source reports that Shingas had six brothers (Tamaqua, Pisquetomen, Nenatcheehunt, Buffalo Horn, Munhuttakiswilluxissohpon, and Miuskillamize). He was a member of the Lenape Turkey clan (or phratry), was a nephew of Sassoonan (also known as Allumapees), a leader who was regarded by colonial authorities in Pennsylvania as the Lenape "king". This title had no traditional meaning for the Lenape, who lived in autonomous villages. However, since the colonial governments of the Thirteen Colonies preferred to deal with a single leader rather than numerous village elders, Sassoonan emerged as the Lenape "king". Colonial officials in Pennsylvania found Sassoonan useful because he could be induced (with the help of gifts such as large quantities of liquor) to sign away Lenape lands to the colony.

== Appointment as chief of the Lenape ==
Sassoonan died in 1747, and Shingas's brother Pisquetomen was designated as Sassoonan's successor. However, Pisquetomen, who was intelligent, strong-willed, and spoke English, was not easily manipulated, and so colonial officials in Pennsylvania refused to recognize him as the Lenape "king". As a result, Shingas and his brothers Pisquetomen, Nenatcheehunt, and Tamaqua migrated away from Pennsylvania, leading their people over the Allegheny Mountains and settling at Kittanning on the Allegheny River. The Haudenosaunee instructed Tanacharison to decide on a leader acceptable to all parties, and at the Logstown Treaty Conference of 1752, Tanacharison presented Shingas as his choice, arguing "that is our right to give you a King" to represent the Lenape in "all publick Business" between the Lenape, the Six Nations, and the British. Tanacharison announced to the Virginia commissioners, "we have given our Cousins, the Delawars, a King, who lives there, we desire you will look upon him as a Chief of that Nation." Shingas was absent from the treaty conference, so Tamaqua "stood proxy for his brother and was presented with a lace hat and jacket and suit."

== 7 Years War ==
The western Lenape were still caught in a three-way power struggle between Great Britain, France, and the Haudenosaunee. The Haudenosaunee at this time claimed sovereignty over the Lenape, a claim that British colonial officials recognized in order to strengthen ties with the Haudenosaunee. In an attempt to assert control over the western Lenape, a Haudenosaunee chief Tanacharison (the "Half-King"), dubbed Shingas the "king" of the Lenape at the treaty conference at the Treaty of Logstown conference in June 1752. British colonial officials approved this "coronation," but would come to regret it, as Shingas proved just as difficult to control as his brother.

The struggle between Great Britain and France for control of the interior of the North American continent began near Shingas's village close to the forks of the Ohio River. Like most Lenape, Shingas and his villagers stayed neutral in the early stages of the conflict, declining to assist George Washington at the Battle of Fort Necessity in 1754 and the Braddock Expedition in 1755. The Lenape had no desire to be French subjects either, but when France asserted dominance in the region after Braddock's defeat, the Lenape reluctantly aligned themselves with France.

Shingas took part in the brutal backcountry war with Great Britain, leading raids deep into colonial settlements in Pennsylvania and Virginia. Although he was an implacable foe in battle, he was never known to treat his prisoners of war with cruelty. Great Britain was unable to mount an effective resistance to the hit-and-run tactics of the Lenape, though the destruction of Shingas's base of operations in the Kittanning Expedition in 1756 surprised the Lenape and compelled them to move further west, settling in what is now Ohio. A peace faction led by Shingas's brother Tamaqua soon gained ascendancy. Though the brothers apparently always worked in harmony, Tamaqua, known to the whites as "the Beaver" or "King Beaver," would eventually eclipse his brothers in fame and influence.

In 1758, Pisquetomen was dispatched to the east to help negotiate the Treaty of Easton, which effectively ended Lenape involvement in the 7 Years War, and enabled British Army officer John Forbes to capture Fort Duquesne without interference from local native tribes. Fearing retribution because of his actions in the war, Shingas kept a low profile.

== Final years ==
The British Army constructed Fort Pitt on the ruins of Fort Duquesne, to the consternation of the local Lenape, contributing to the outbreak of Pontiac's War in 1763. Fort Pitt was besieged by the Lenape; Shingas may have participated in the siege at this time. He and Tamaqua unsuccessfully tried to convince the garrison of Fort Pitt to withdraw from the region, but the fort was relieved by an expedition led by Swiss mercenary Henry Bouquet. Shingas and Tamaqua, who advised accommodation with Great Britain, began to lose influence to more militant Lenape leaders influenced by Neolin, the "Delaware Prophet". Shingas disappears from the historical record around 1764; some historians have speculated that he may have contracted smallpox from blankets distributed to the besieging Lenape from Fort Pitt during the siege, but there is no clear evidence that he died as a result of the incident.

== Bibliography ==
- Franks, Kenny A. "Tamaqua" in American National Biography. Oxford University Press, 1999.
- Lambert, Paul F. "Shingas" in American National Biography. Oxford University Press, 1999.
- McConnell, Michael N. A Country Between: The Upper Ohio Valley and Its Peoples, 1724–1774. Lincoln: University of Nebraska Press, 1992.
- Weslager, C. A. The Delaware Indians. New Brunswick, New Jersey, 1972.
- White, Richard. The Middle Ground: Indians, Empires, and Republics in the Great Lakes Region, 1650–1815. New York, 1991.
