= Pennsylvania forts in the French and Indian War =

- Province of Pennsylvania in British America
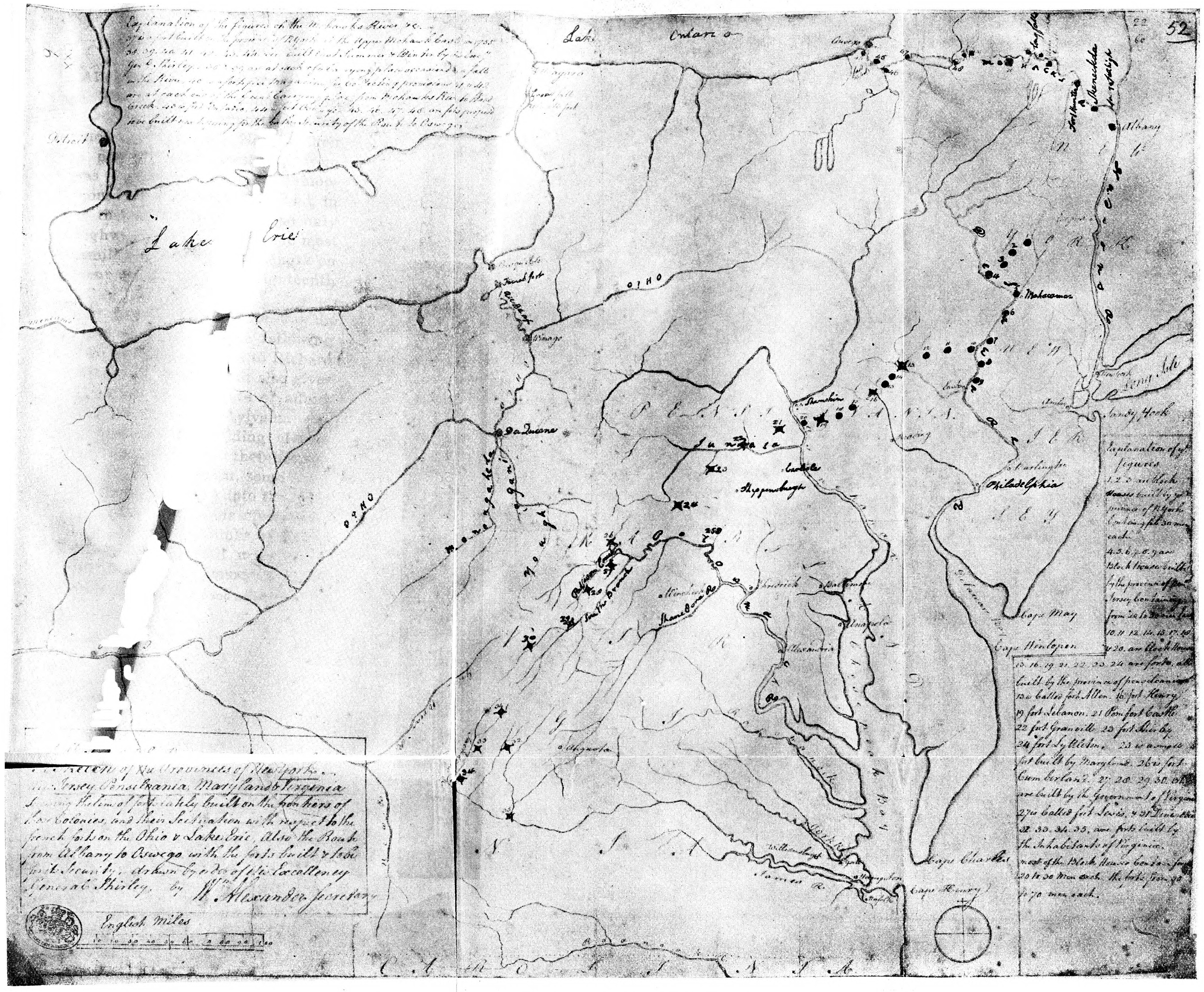
- 1756 map of Pennsylvania forts and blockhouses, showing the defensive line from the New Jersey border to the Maryland border.

Site information
- Owner: National Park Service
- Open to the public: Fort Necessity, Fort Ligonier, Fort Loudoun, Fort Bedford, Light's Fort, Heinrich Zeller House, Fort Pitt Block House

Site history
- Built: 1754-1759
- In use: Until 1760, a few refurbished in 1763, a small number in use up to 1783
- Fate: Abandoned or demolished
- Battles/wars: French and Indian War; Battle of Fort Necessity; Battle of Fort Ligonier; Battle of Fort Duquesne

During the French and Indian War, the Province of Pennsylvania built a defensive chain of forts from the New Jersey border, southwest to the Maryland border, in response to numerous attacks on civilian settlements by Native American war parties under the direction of French officers and often with the aid of French troops. Settlers also built a number of stockaded blockhouses, as a second line of defense, in which they and their families could take shelter when attacked. The forts and some of the blockhouses were garrisoned with provincial regulars or militia.

The forts were built within a day's march of each other, so that patrols could range between them to prevent Native American war parties from traveling freely to attack settlements. Nonetheless, attacks persisted, and in 1755 when Fort McCord and Fort Granville were captured and burned by French and Native American forces, it became apparent that many of the forts were too far apart and too difficult to supply. The Kittanning Expedition in September destroyed the Lenape village of Kittanning, which had been used as a staging area for Native American attacks, but raids on Pennsylvania settlements continued until the Forbes Expedition in 1758 succeeded in capturing Fort Duquesne. Significant victories elsewhere eventually led to the French capitulation in 1760, and as the forts were expensive to garrison and supply, many of them were abandoned and dismantled. During Pontiac's War in 1763, a few forts were refurbished, and several remained in use during the American Revolutionary War.

== Background ==
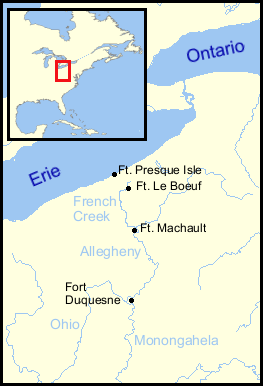
French Forts in western Pennsylvania, 1753 and 1754

Competition between Britain and France over control of the Ohio Country began to escalate with the destruction of the British fort at Pickawillany in 1752. Pennsylvania authorities were alarmed when the French built Fort Presque Isle and Fort Le Boeuf in 1753, although it was unclear at the time whether these forts were built in British colonial territory. In August, French troops occupied the trading post and blacksmith forge of Scottish frontiersman John Fraser, and built Fort Machault around it. The Ohio Company attempted to counter this by building Fort Prince George at the forks of the Ohio in April 1754, but the French quickly captured the fort and replaced it with their own Fort Duquesne. In June, Washington's Virginia troops hastily built Fort Necessity, which the French captured and destroyed in July. This military occupation of territory, by building forts as supply and communication points, would determine the control of colonial lands and would define the frontier for both nations.

Braddock's defeat at the Battle of the Monongahela in July 1755 left Pennsylvania without a professional military force. The Pennsylvania Provincial Assembly, composed largely at the time of Quakers who opposed any kind of military action for religious reasons, resisted the construction of fortresses and the formation of a militia, but pressure from the displaced settlers forced them to appropriate funds for weapons and the construction of blockhouses for civilian refuge. On July 31, the Provincial Assembly received petitions from several townships in Lancaster County, "setting forth the great Danger they apprehend themselves to be in since the late Defeat of the Forces under General Braddock, and praying that this House would furnish them with Arms and Ammunition for Defence of their Houses and Families." On August 22, the Assembly granted £1000 and formed a committee of five members, one of whom was Benjamin Franklin. By October the committee had purchased five hundred guns and ammunition which were distributed to settlers in Cumberland, York, and Lancaster counties.

The British perception that the conflict would mainly involve European armies was quickly revised when Native American war parties began targeting civilian communities. Lenape chiefs Shingas and Captain Jacobs launched dozens of raids against British colonial settlements, killing and capturing hundreds of colonists and destroying settlements across western and central Pennsylvania. The Penn's Creek massacre in October 1755, and the Great Cove massacre and the Gnadenhütten massacre in November, resulted in the deaths of fifty settlers and the capture of dozens more. Almost immediately, thousands of colonists abandoned their farms and communities and fled to the safer cities near the Atlantic coast, threatening the colony with economic collapse.

The Provincial Assembly decided that merely sending arms and ammunition to settlers would not be an adequate response. Community leaders demanded protection, petitioning the Assembly to "grant a sufficient Sum of Money to maintain such a Number of regular Troops as may be thought necessary to defend our Frontiers, and build Fortifications in proper Places." On November 2, Colonel John Armstrong wrote to Governor Robert Hunter Morris: "I'm of the opinion that no other means than a Chain of Block Houses along or near the south side of the Kittatinny Mountains, from the Sasquehannah to the Temporary Line, can Secure the Lives and properties of the Inhabitants of this Country, the new Settlements being all fled except Shareman's Valley." On November 17, settlers in Cumberland County submitted a petition to the Assembly for "A Line of Forts [to] be Erected from Potowmack to Susquehanna." On November 26, Governor Morris signed into law "An Act for the better ordering and Regulating such as are willing and desirous to be united for Military Purposes within this Province", including a grant of sixty thousand pounds from the Assembly, to build a string of defensive forts across central Pennsylvania, and to pay for the training, arming and provision of troops to defend the colony. On December 10 and 11, over a hundred Native Americans attacked farms and a mission school near Stroudsburg, Pennsylvania during the Northampton massacre, burning 45 buildings and killing as many as 89 people.

== Construction ==
Governor Robert Hunter Morris was in Shippensburg in July 1755, when he received the news of Braddock's defeat. Morris immediately laid out the ground plan for a fort in the town, and ordered a similar fort to be constructed in neighboring Carlisle. These forts (Fort Morris and Carlisle Fort) were the first proposed in what later became the defensive line of forts and blockhouses on the Pennsylvania frontier, although neither was completed until 1756. In response to rumors that French troops were preparing to advance into central Pennsylvania, other communities immediately began planning their own forts, but the colony lacked any tradition of fort-building, and no military engineers were then available to supervise construction.

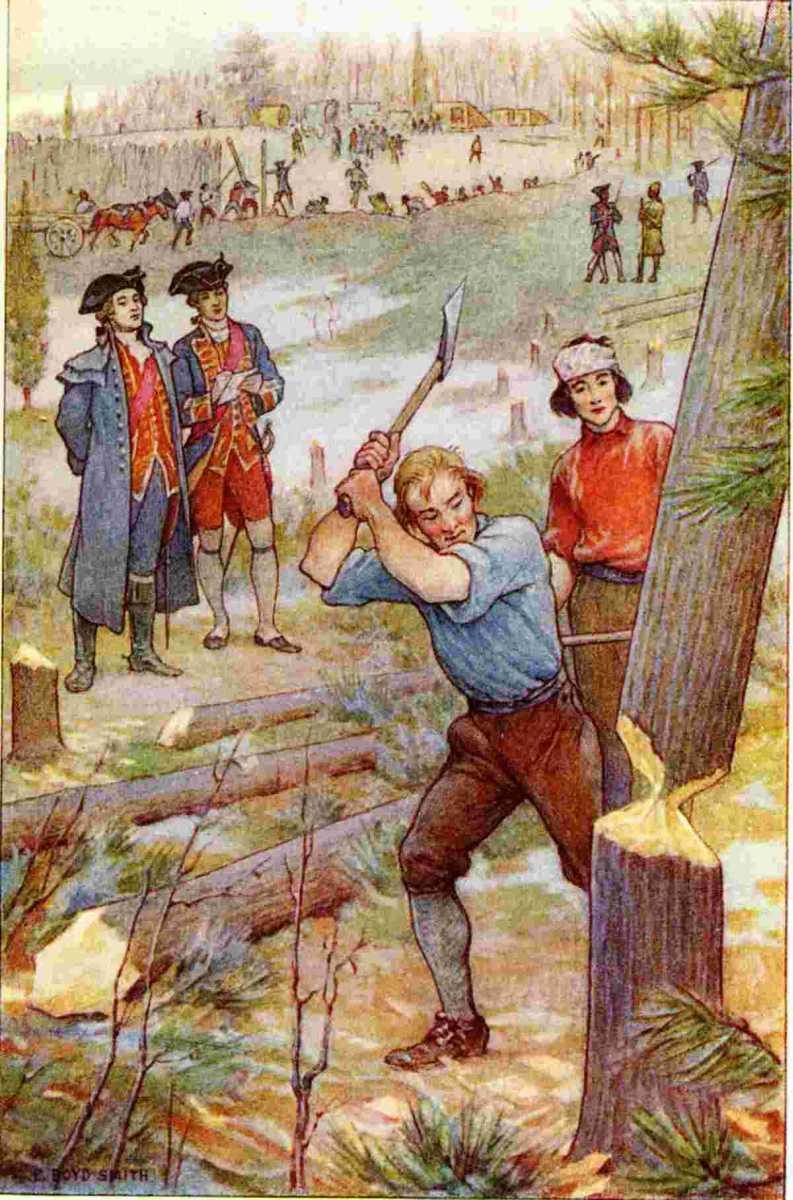
Benjamin Franklin supervising the construction of the first forts in Pennsylvania, early 1756.

Benjamin Franklin was charged with establishing a line of defense that would protect Pennsylvania settlements from attacks by French-allied Native Americans. He supervised the construction of Fort Hamilton and Fort Depuy in December 1755 and Fort Norris, Fort Allen and Fort Franklin in early 1756. However, Franklin felt that the responsibility for building forts should be given to someone with more military training, and offered a colonel's commission to Captain William Clapham, who accepted. Clapham supervised the construction of Fort Hunter, Fort Halifax and Fort Augusta, the largest fort in Pennsylvania at the time, with a garrison of over 350 troops. At the same time, twenty other forts were built in addition to two dozen blockhouses constructed by settlers. East of the Susquehanna River, the chain of forts ran parallel and to the south of the Blue Mountain, and west of the river it lay just northwest of the mountains. The defensive line stretched from Fort Dupuy near the New Jersey border, southwest to Fort Loudoun on the Maryland border, and was largely finished by September 1756, with the completion of Fort Morris.

Settlers immediately began fortifying homesteads and mills to serve as blockhouses where civilians could take refuge when attacked. George Croghan fortified his trading post at Aughwick Creek in September 1755, and this later became Fort Shirley. Thomas McKee began fortifying Hunter's Mill in October, and this eventually became Fort Hunter. Peter Hedrick fortified his homestead and this eventually became Fort Swatara. William Maxwell (a survivor of the Braddock Expedition) formed a company of militia at Peters Township and began building a stockade at McDowell's Mill on November 3. Fortified homesteads included Fort Dupuy, Fort Deshler, Light's Fort, Whitefield House, and Heinrich Zeller House. The provincial government frequently assisted communities in building their own forts, recognizing that this offered more protection for more people. Some of these community blockhouses later received garrisons of provincial troops and swivel guns. These smaller "private forts" provided refuge for civilians and bolstered confidence that Native American attacks could be resisted, encouraging settlers to stay on their farms.

=== Typical design and layout ===
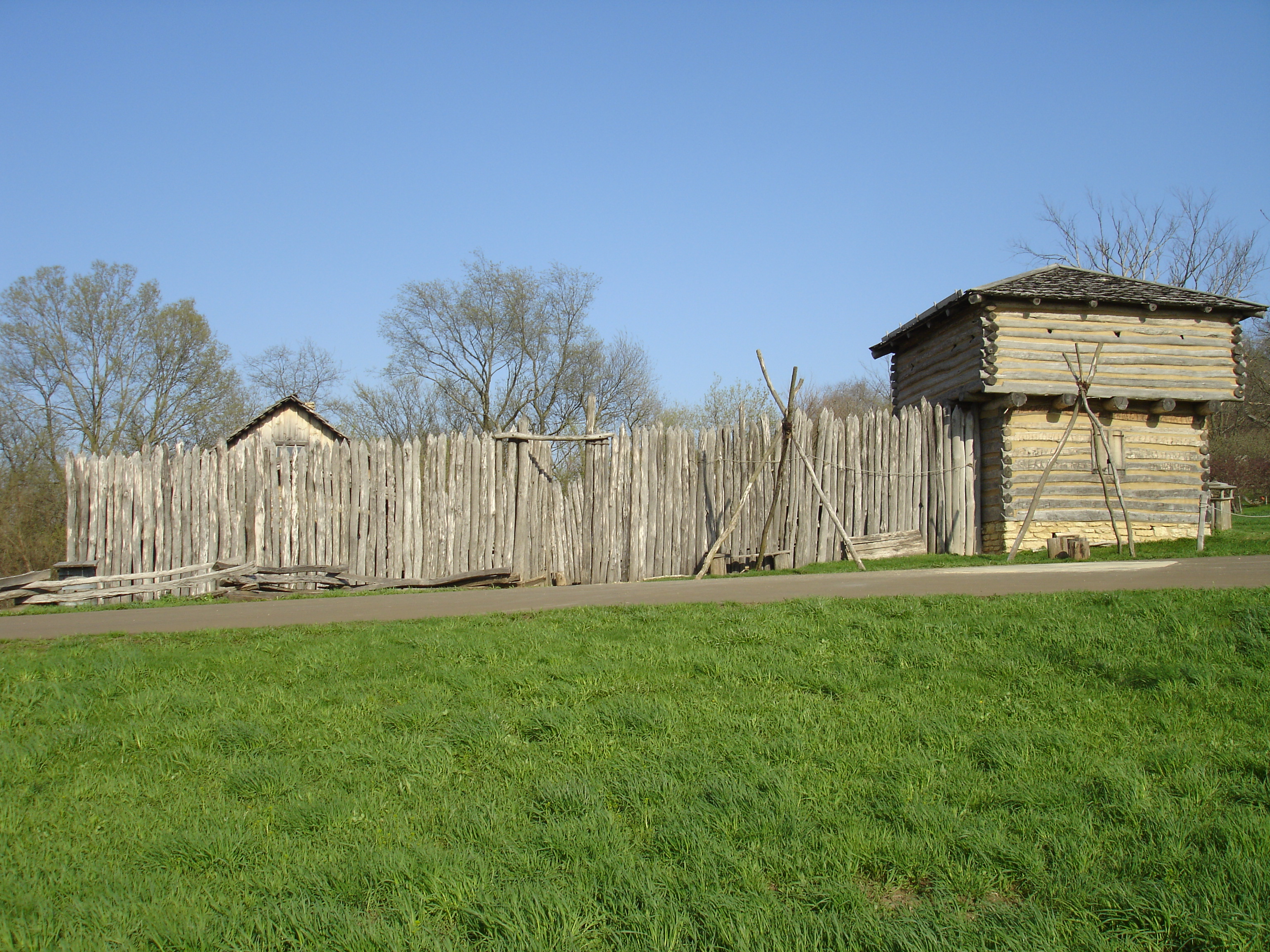
Reconstructed stockade and blockhouse similar to the design used for most Pennsylvania forts.

Although the technology existed to build robust stone structures such as Fort Pitt, the British government was reluctant to construct permanent fortresses that, if captured, would give the enemy defensible strongholds. The province had only a few months to prepare defenses, and so a simple design using locally available materials seemed logical. In 1754, Prince William, Duke of Cumberland, advised Major General Edward Braddock that "His Royal Highness thinks that stockaded forts, with pallisadoes and a good ditch, capable of containing 200 men or 400 upon an emergency, will be sufficient for the present." In July 1755, Governor Robert Hunter Morris suggested a square plan with bastions at each corner, and most of the forts adhered to this model.

With very few exceptions, the French and Indian War era forts built in Pennsylvania were temporary log and earth structures that deteriorated quickly, required constant maintenance, and were vulnerable to fire or artillery. Fort Granville was captured after Lenape warriors set fire to a wall, destroying it. Artillery was rarely deployed against Pennsylvania forts, as most attacks involved only French-allied Native American warriors. In 1756, French troops brought two small brass cannons with them when they planned to attack Fort Augusta, but after reconnoitering, they found the distance too great for the guns to shoot from the hill opposite the fort, and the attack was abandoned. Colonel Clapham had taken particular care to reinforce the fort's main walls so that they would resist artillery, however most Pennsylvania forts were not so elaborate. Some forts were merely fortified homesteads with firing slits or loopholes cut into the walls, or two-story blockhouses surrounded by stockades.

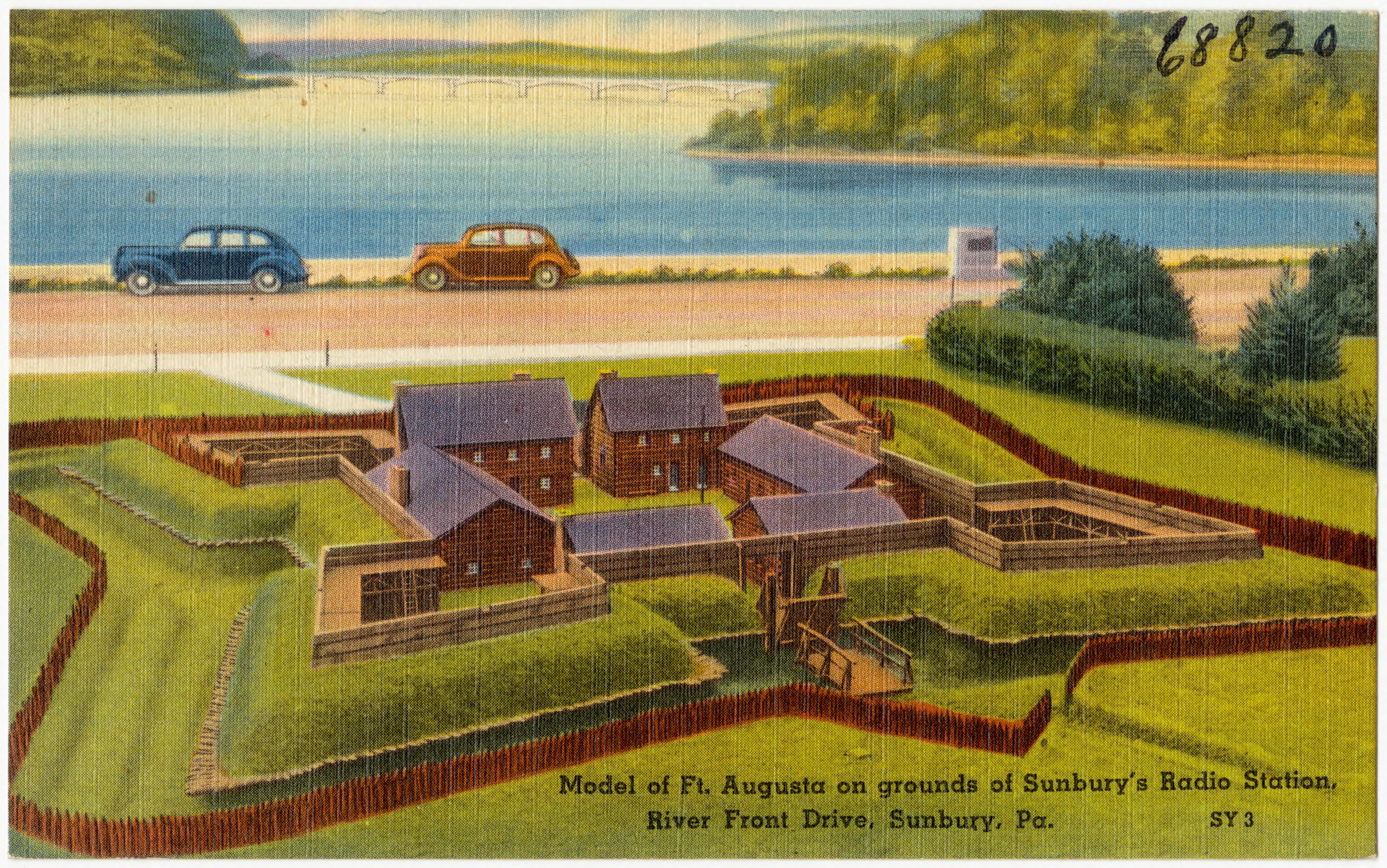
Model of Fort Augusta, the largest and most elaborate fort in Pennsylvania at the time, with a curtain wall, a glacis, bastions at each corner, parapets, and a dry defensive ditch with a drawbridge.

The typical layout for a garrisoned provincial fort included a palisade composed of either upright logs embedded into a trench, or sometimes supported logs lying parallel to the surface. The curtain wall often had a parapet from which defenders could fire at the enemy. Bastions allowed defenders at the corners to crossfire at attackers approaching the walls, and were sometimes equipped with swivel guns or small cannon. A few forts, including Fort Pitt and Fort Augusta, had a glacis or a slope surrounding the fort, so that attackers approaching the walls were exposed to fire. The glacis also protected the walls from artillery fire. Fort Henry and Fort Augusta were each surrounded by a dry defensive ditch, but this was uncommon in Pennsylvania forts.

Internal structures were usually set back from the stockade to avoid being set on fire by attackers (Mercer's Fort is an exception to this rule). These structures included barracks, storerooms, a kitchen, officers' quarters, and a gunpowder magazine, frequently built of stone, or sometimes underground, to reduce damage in the event of an explosion. Most forts had a well, but some of the smaller forts were built near or around a source of running water. Cisterns inside the fort stored rainwater, or sometimes beef or pork. Larger forts also included temporary accommodations for civilians sheltering from attacks. Most buildings were constructed entirely of wood (except for the magazine), although a few forts, such as Fort Henry and Fort Chambers, had tile, lead plate, or slate-shingle roofs to prevent fire.

== Problems and challenges ==
By the summer of 1756, over three thousand colonists had been killed or captured in Pennsylvania, Virginia and the Carolinas. Numerous settlements had been burned or abandoned. Between Braddock's defeat in July 1755 and the raid on Kittanning in September 1756, Native American war parties conducted at least seventy-eight raids in Pennsylvania, killing 484 Pennsylvanians and capturing at least 202. However, the construction of forts and blockhouses, garrisoned with provincial troops and militias, well-supplied and in regular communication, meant that Native American war parties could no longer attack isolated farms and small communities without confronting armed resistance. Pennsylvania troops often pursued attackers, particularly war parties that had taken captives, as in the Battle of Sideling Hill in April 1756, when three companies of militia under the command of Captain Hance Hamilton attempted to rescue 27 prisoners taken after the capture of Fort McCord. In September, Colonel John Armstrong attacked and destroyed the Lenape village of Kittanning, the first military strike at a Native American community that was used as a staging area for war parties. This demonstrated that the defensive line of forts was robust enough to launch offensive strikes, turning the course of the war.

=== Garrisons ===
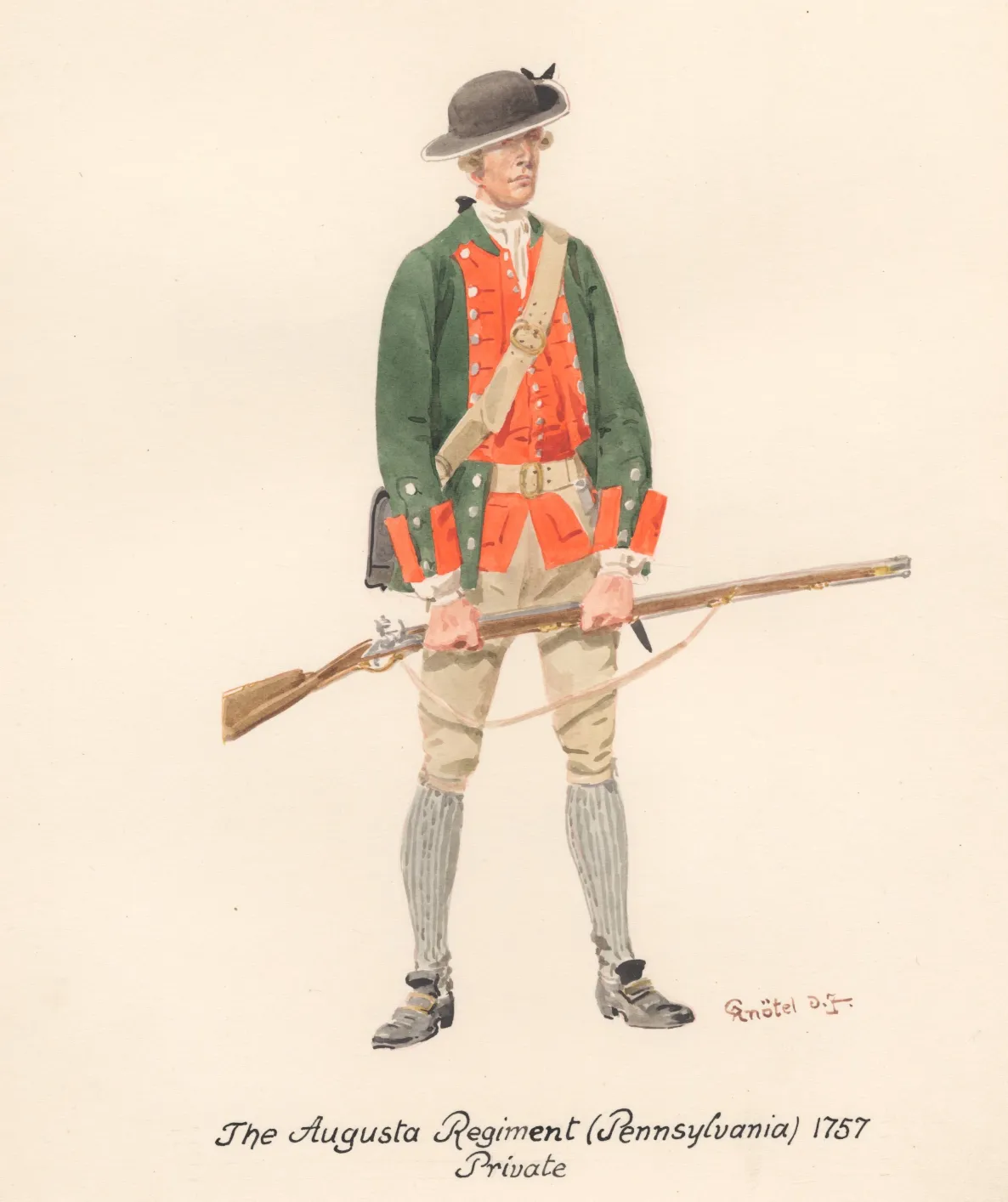
Illustration of an Augusta Regiment private in 1757. The regiment was the first provincial unit raised in Pennsylvania and participated in the construction of Fort Augusta, Fort Hunter, and Fort Halifax.

Nonetheless, maintaining 23 forts with food and ammunition, paying soldiers' salaries, and keeping up recruitment to replace troops lost in battle or by desertion or the end of their enlistments, was an enormous financial and logistical burden on the province. Although the forts themselves served as strongholds, it was essential to "range" between forts to detect enemy war parties moving through the countryside, meaning that a part of each garrison would be absent from the fort while on patrol. Fort commanders with little training often administered arbitrary discipline, leading to mutinies, such as took place at Fort Allen. Commanders were under pressure to petition for food, blankets and tools, and often had to give precious supplies to friendly Indians as a means of preventing violence. The Quaker pacifist Assembly resisted passing any law creating a legitimate military force, but permitted volunteer Associations to form, and granted commissions to officers elected by the troops. As the need for a professional defense force became more evident, more pay for troops became available, but it was not generous, there were often long delays between payments, and some troops were never paid at all.

=== Living conditions ===
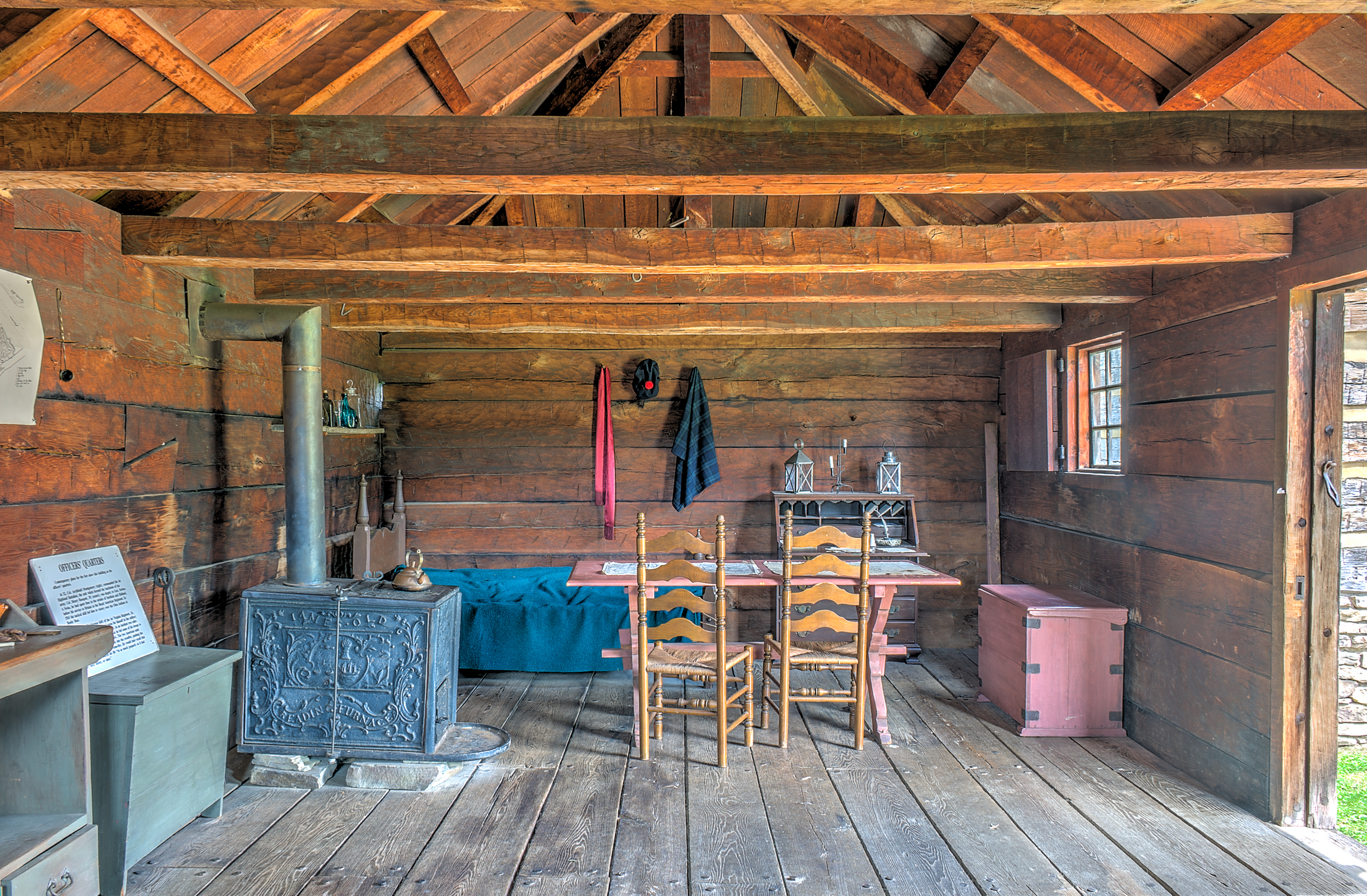
Reconstructed officer's quarters at Fort Ligonier.

Living conditions at the forts were rustic and uncomfortable. The province provided flour and some salted meat, but meat frequently spoiled during transport and storage, and troops were sometimes served foul-smelling, maggoty meals. Smoked and salted meat were expensive and not widely available in frontier forts, but live cattle were driven to some forts. Soldiers could hunt or purchase game meat from friendly Native Americans, mostly venison. When the fort had no well, troops would have to collect water from outside the fort, at their own risk. The forts were often overcrowded, the barracks smoky and smelly, and blankets, shoes and clothing were scarce. A percentage of every garrison was constantly ill, and access to medical care (such as it was) was sporadic. Looming over all this was the ceaseless threat of attack, and stealthy Native American war-parties harassed the forts by ambushing soldiers, stealing or destroying food, tools and weapons, and setting buildings on fire. Civilians supposedly under the protection of the forts were murdered and kidnapped regularly, forcing them to take refuge inside the forts, straining supplies of food and water. Morale occasionally fell to the point where the number of new recruits could barely compensate for men lost through desertion.

== The Forbes Expedition ==
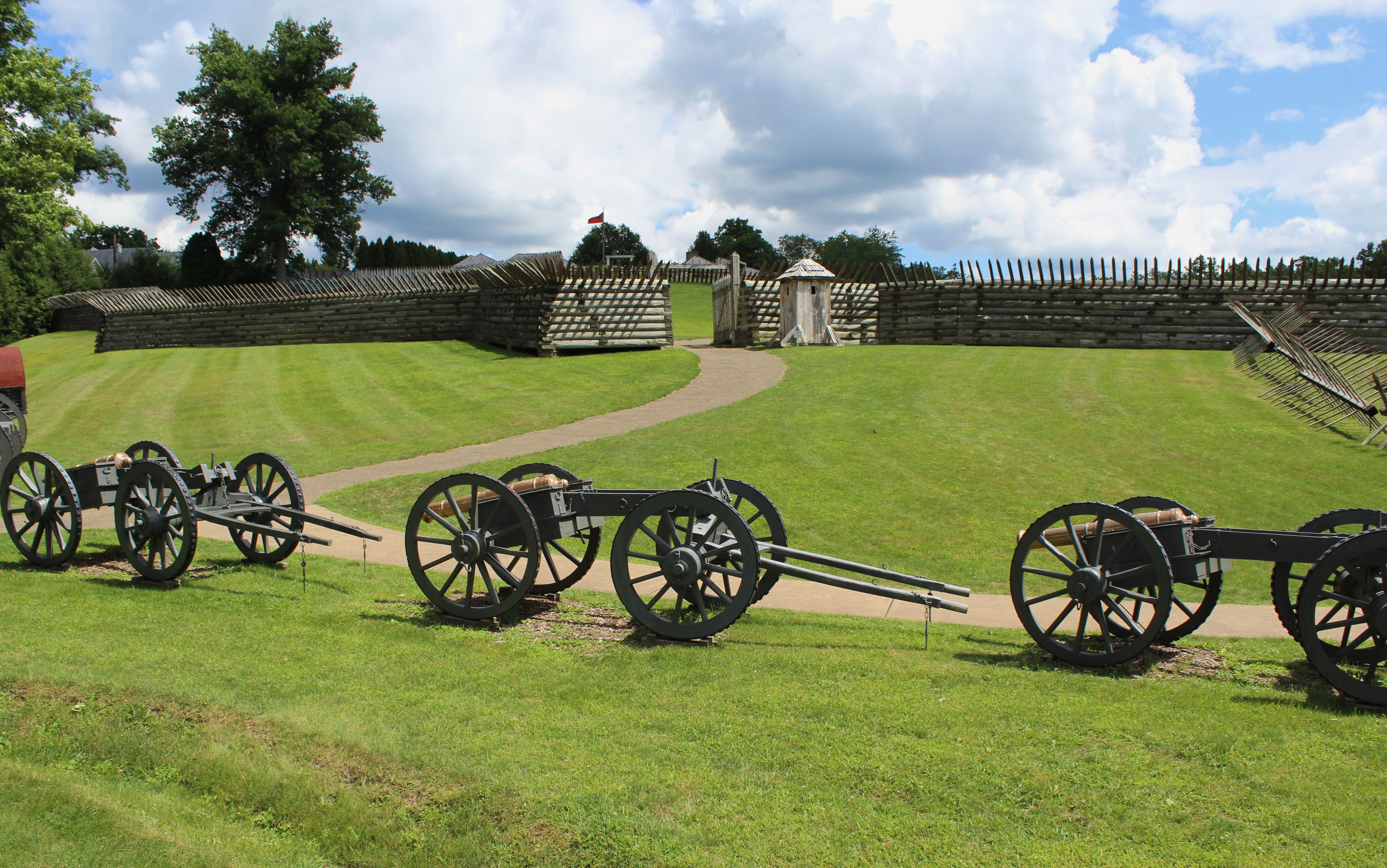
Reconstruction of Fort Ligonier, showing the palisade and gate with artillery.

After the Kittanning Expedition in September 1756, the Lenape raided Pennsylvania settlements less frequently, giving the Pennsylvania an opportunity to prepare to go on the offensive against the French. The British hoped to put pressure on the French strongholds in the west, Fort Duquesne, Fort Machault, Fort Le Boeuf and Fort Presque Isle. Events in New York had severely restricted the flow of supplies to these forts, and Colonel Henry Bouquet (in place of General Forbes, who was ill) sent Major James Grant to reconnoiter the area around Fort Duquesne with 850 men. Grant thought to exploit the fort's weakness but was overwhelmed at the Battle of Fort Duquesne, in which half of his men were killed and he was taken prisoner. The British then built Fort Ligonier to serve as winter headquarters and a staging area for another assault on Fort Duquesne. In October 1758, Fort Ligonier was assaulted by 440 French troops and 150 Lenape warriors, but without artillery they were unable to take the fort, even though they inflicted over a hundred casualties.

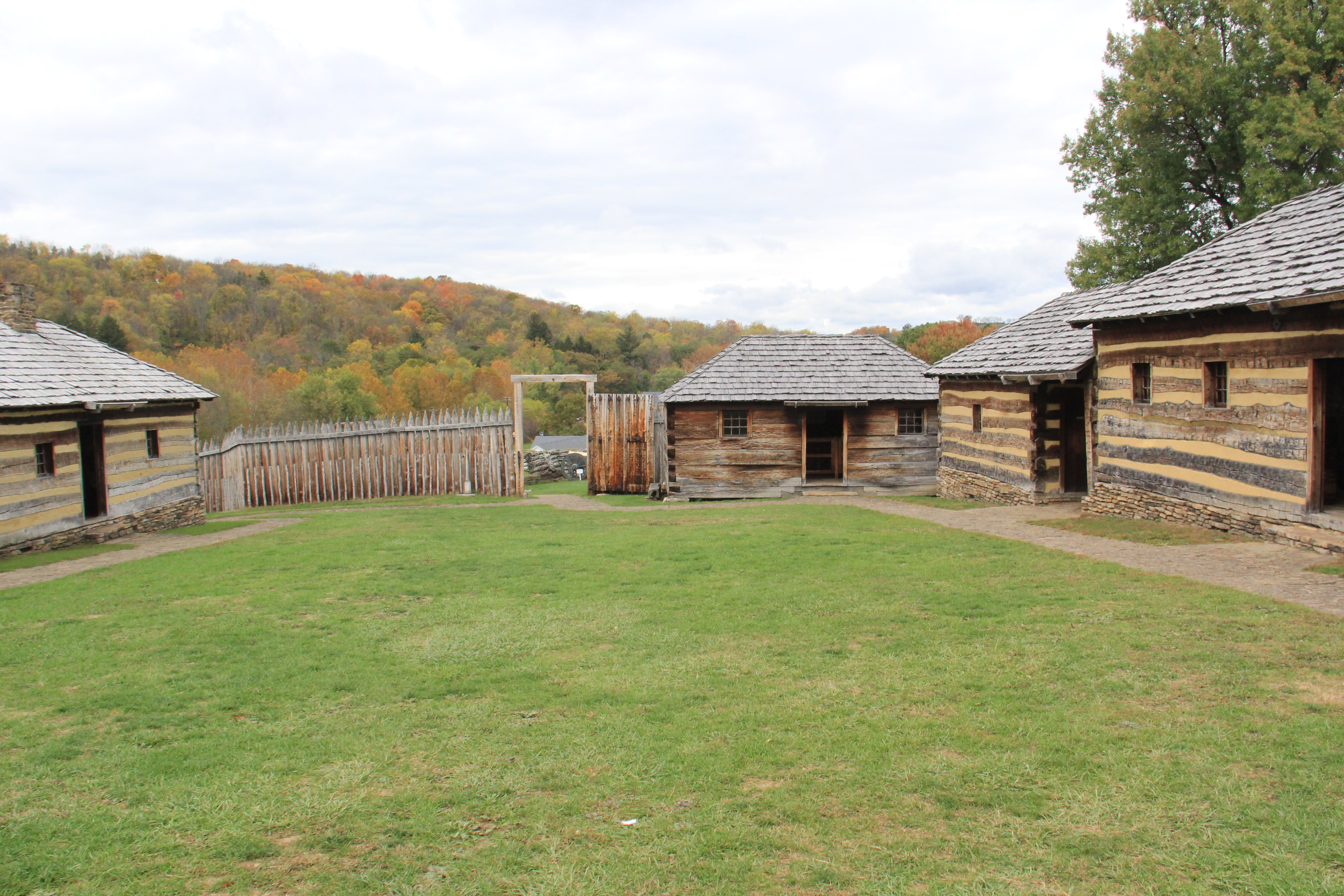
Reconstruction of Fort Ligonier, showing an interior section with barracks and storage buildings.

At this time, the British succeeded in negotiations with Teedyuscung, who claimed to represent the Lenape, and the Treaty of Easton was signed on October 26, to which the Six Nations, the Lenape and the Shawnee were signatories. This treaty weakened the Native American support for the French in Pennsylvania, and while their military support for the British was tenuous, it allowed the Forbes Expedition to assault and capture Fort Duquesne in November 1758. Within two years, Fort Pitt was built on the site of Fort Duquesne, and was at the time the largest fort in Pennsylvania. Unlike most Pennsylvania forts of this period, Fort Pitt was constructed under the supervision of two experienced military engineers, Captain Harry Gordon and Major James Robertson, both of the 60th Royal American Regiment.

== Aftermath and legacy ==
By 1760, most of Pennsylvania was under British control, and the expensive and complex defensive chain of forts was quickly dismantled. Most were abandoned by the start of Pontiac's War in 1763, but a few forts were refurbished for use as patrol stations or supply depots. An even smaller number were put to use during the American Revolutionary War. Four forts from the mid-18th century have been reconstructed: Fort Necessity, Fort Ligonier, Fort Bedford, and Fort Loudoun. The only remaining building associated with Fort Pitt is the Fort Pitt Block House. Two private forts, Heinrich Zeller House and Light's Fort, are open to the public.

== See also ==
- Fort Allen
- Fort Augusta
- Fort Bedford
- Fort Bigham
- Carlisle Fort
- Fort Chambers
- Fort Depuy
- Fort Deshler
- Fort Duquesne
- Fort Franklin
- Fort Granville
- Fort Halifax
- Fort Hamilton
- Fort Henry
- Fort Hunter
- Fort Hyndshaw
- Fort Juniata Crossing
- Fort Lebanon
- Fort Le Boeuf
- Light's Fort
- Fort Ligonier
- Fort Loudoun
- Fort Lyttleton
- Fort Machault
- Fort Manada
- McDowell's Mill
- Fort McCord
- Mercer's Fort
- Fort Morris
- Fort Necessity
- Fort Norris
- Fort Northkill
- Fort Pitt
- Fort Presque Isle
- Fort Prince George
- Redstone Old Fort
- Fort Robinson
- Fort Shirley
- Fort Swatara
- Fort Venango
- Whitefield House
- Fort William
- Heinrich Zeller House
