= Light's Fort =

18th century fortified house in Pennsylvania, U.S.

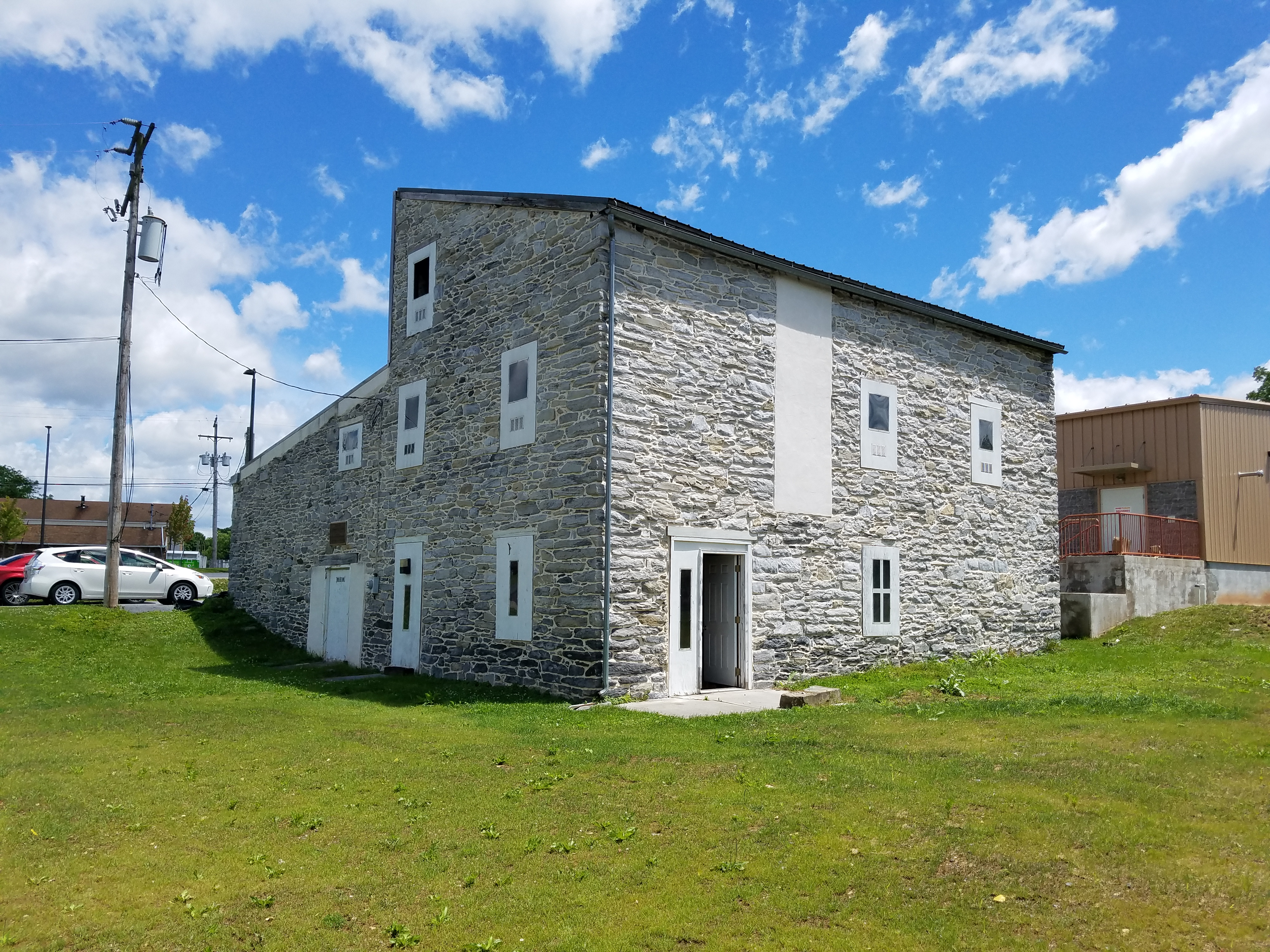
- The southwest view of Light's Fort in Lebanon, Pennsylvania.

- Location within Pennsylvania Location within the United States
- Former names: Johannes Leicht (John Light) Homestead

General information
- Type: Fort
- Architectural style: COLONIAL: Pennsylvania German Traditional
- Location: 660 North 11th Street, Lebanon, Pennsylvania, US
- Coordinates: 40°20′57.048″N 76°25′50.3760″W
- Completed: 1742
- Cost: Unknown
- Owner: Historic Preservation Trust of Lebanon County

Technical details
- Structural system: Limestone Building Stones (14 inches thick)
- Floor area: Cellar: 1200 sq. ft.; First Floor: 1200 sq. ft.; Second Floor; 600 sq. ft.; Attic: 300 sq. ft.

Light's Fort was built in 1742 by Johannes Leicht [John Light]. It is the oldest standing building in the county and city of Lebanon, Pennsylvania, United States. Intended for use as a shelter for local settlers during Native American attacks, its stone construction and tile roof made it impervious to fire. In addition to being John Light's homestead, the building later served as a distillery, a meeting house, and a warehouse. Tunnels beneath the building ran under the town of Lebanon, allowing access to other residences in the community. Ongoing renovations by the Historic Preservation Trust of Lebanon County will preserve the structure and maintain its 18th-century appearance.

== History ==
John Light arrived in Pennsylvania in 1719 and purchased land on December 29, 1738, from Caspar Wistar ("Brass Button Maker of the City of Philadelphia"), and his wife Katherine, for 82 pounds and 4 shillings. Light's Fort was built in 1742 on a branch of the Quittapahilla Creek in Lancaster County (now Lebanon County) at North 11th and Maple Streets. It contained 274 acres including an allowance of 6% for roads together with woods, water courses, etc.

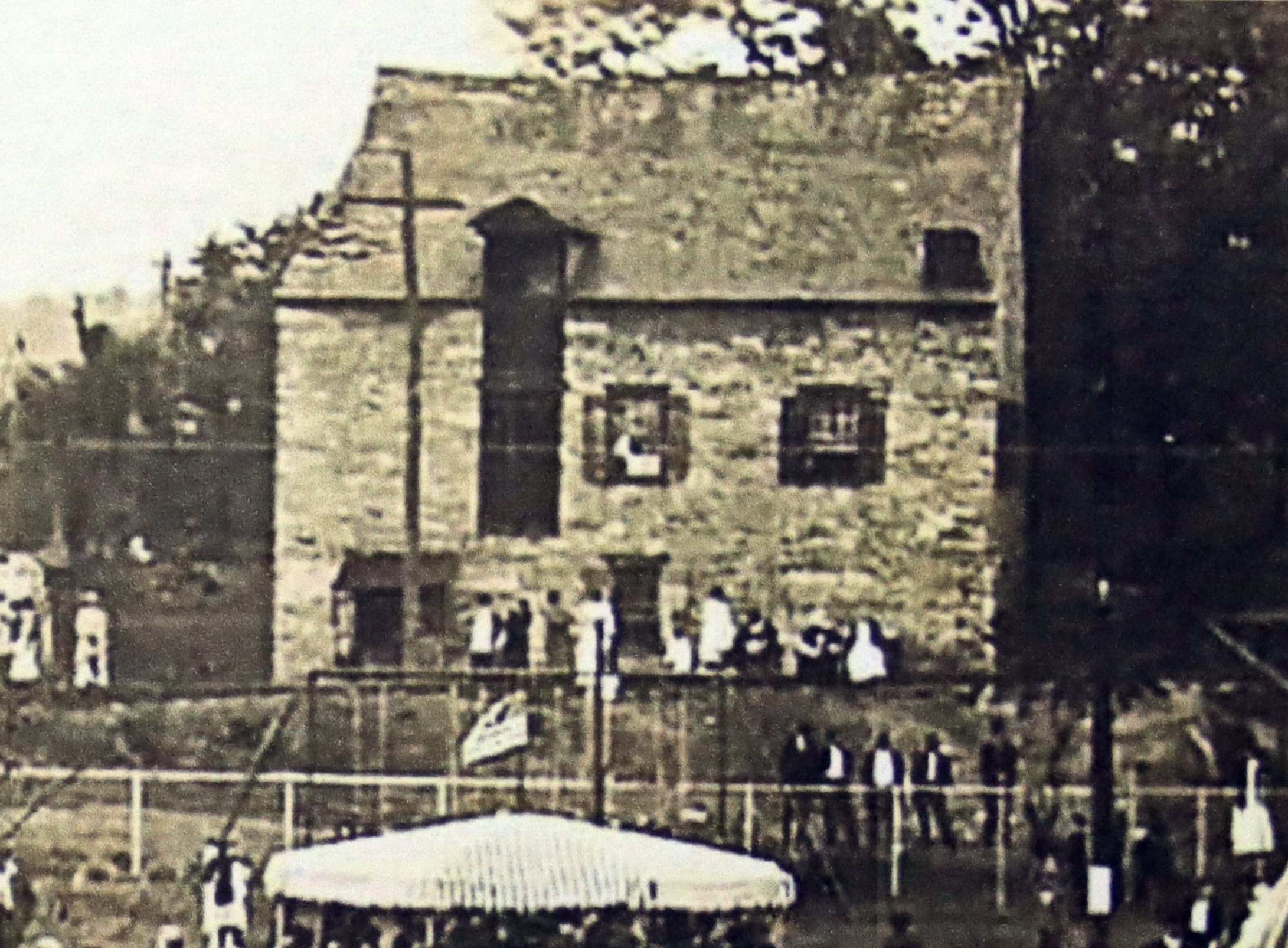
A circa 1915 photo of the south side of Light's Fort with the grain hoist visible.

Light's Fort was used as a frontier homestead, a community meeting hall, a Mennonite religious meeting facility, a storage warehouse when the Union Canal (Pennsylvania) was operating, and a private fortress during the French and Indian War that could shelter up to two hundred settlers during Native American uprisings. From 1895 until his death in 1904, it was the residence of Black Civil War veteran Owen W. Jones, who organized some of the county's first African Methodist Episcopal Church Sunday school classes. In modern times, it has been used as a grain storage facility, a distillery, a beverage distributorship, apartment building and museum.

== Description ==
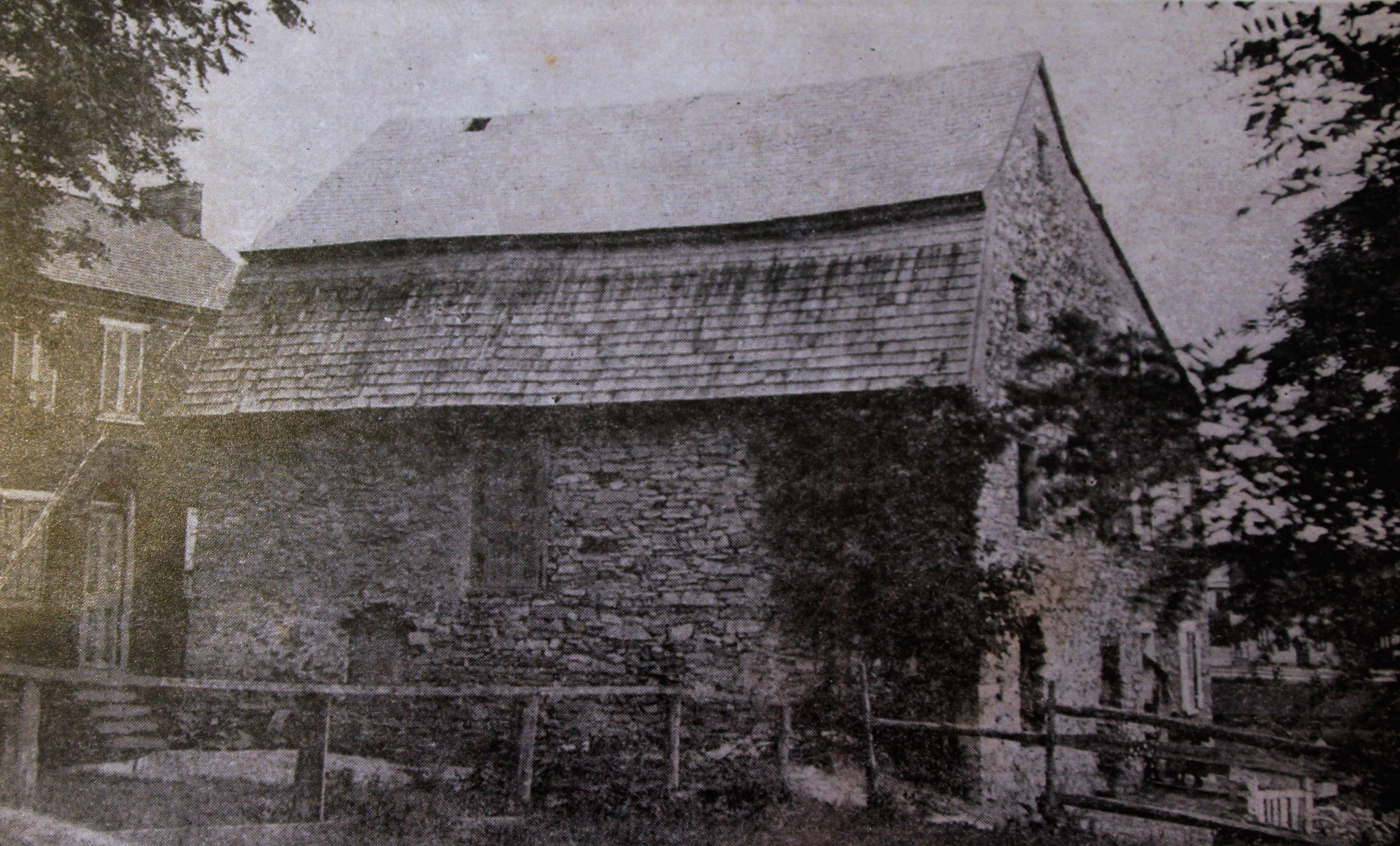
A circa 1895 picture of the original configuration of Light's Fort.

The dimensions of Light's Fort are 30 feet (9.2m) by 40 feet (12.3m). It is built of local limestone and timbers. Its architectural style is Colonial: Pennsylvania German Traditional, which was used by early German-speaking settlers in the southeastern and central Pennsylvania area in the 1700s. When it was built, it had two and a half stories, but due to strong storms and renovations, part of the second story and most of the attic have been removed. It also has a large arched basement that is accessed by a set of limestone stairs. The cellar was built over a constant running fresh water spring and was used for cold storage. The fresh water spring survives today. A bronze plaque is attached above the west side entrance door that reads:

"Home and Refuge of Johannes Leicht – (John Light) D. 1759, LIGHT’S FORT, Built 1742, Placed by the Tulpehocken Chapter of the Daughters of the American Colonists, 1974."

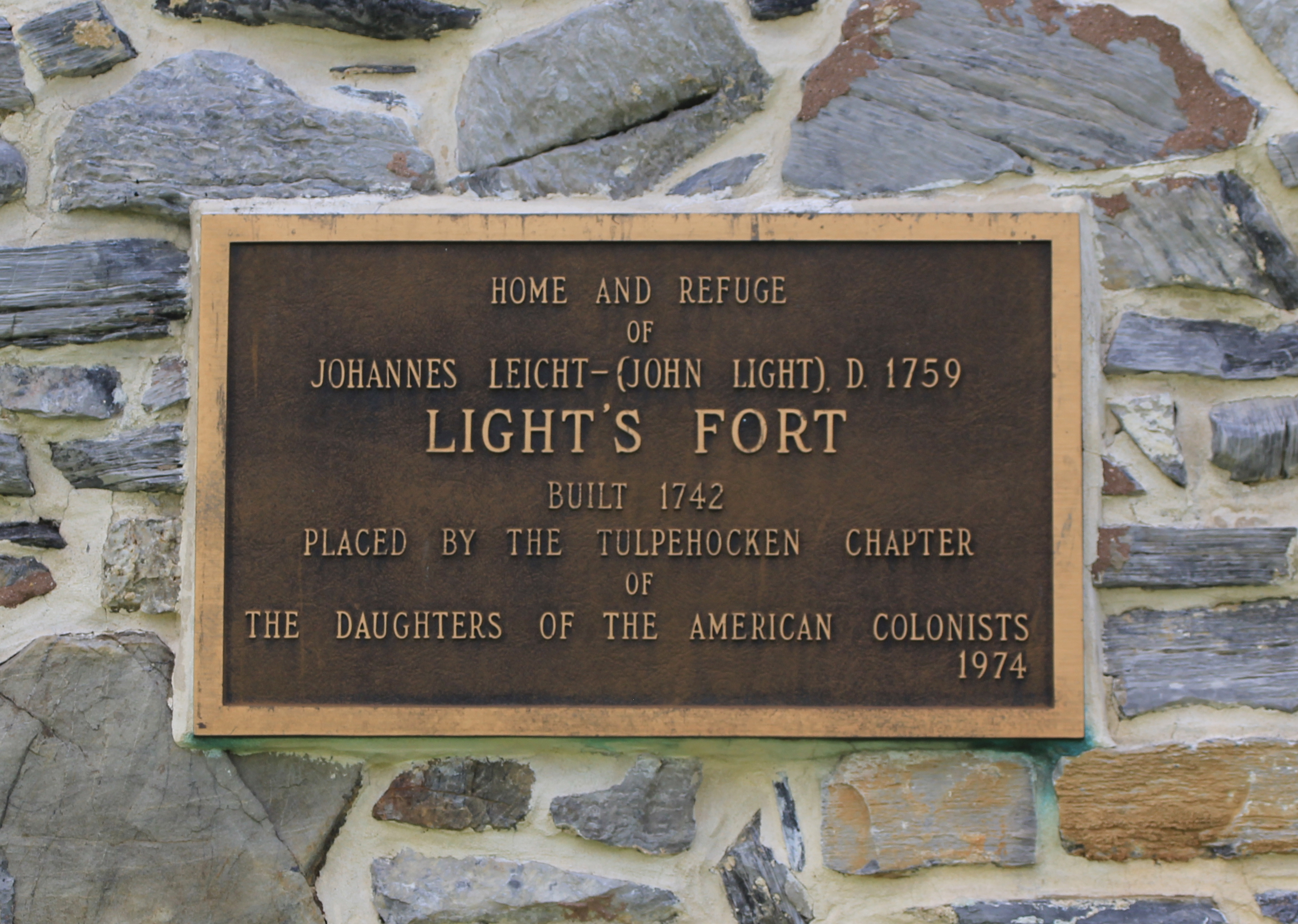
A view of the bronze plaque at Light's Fort.

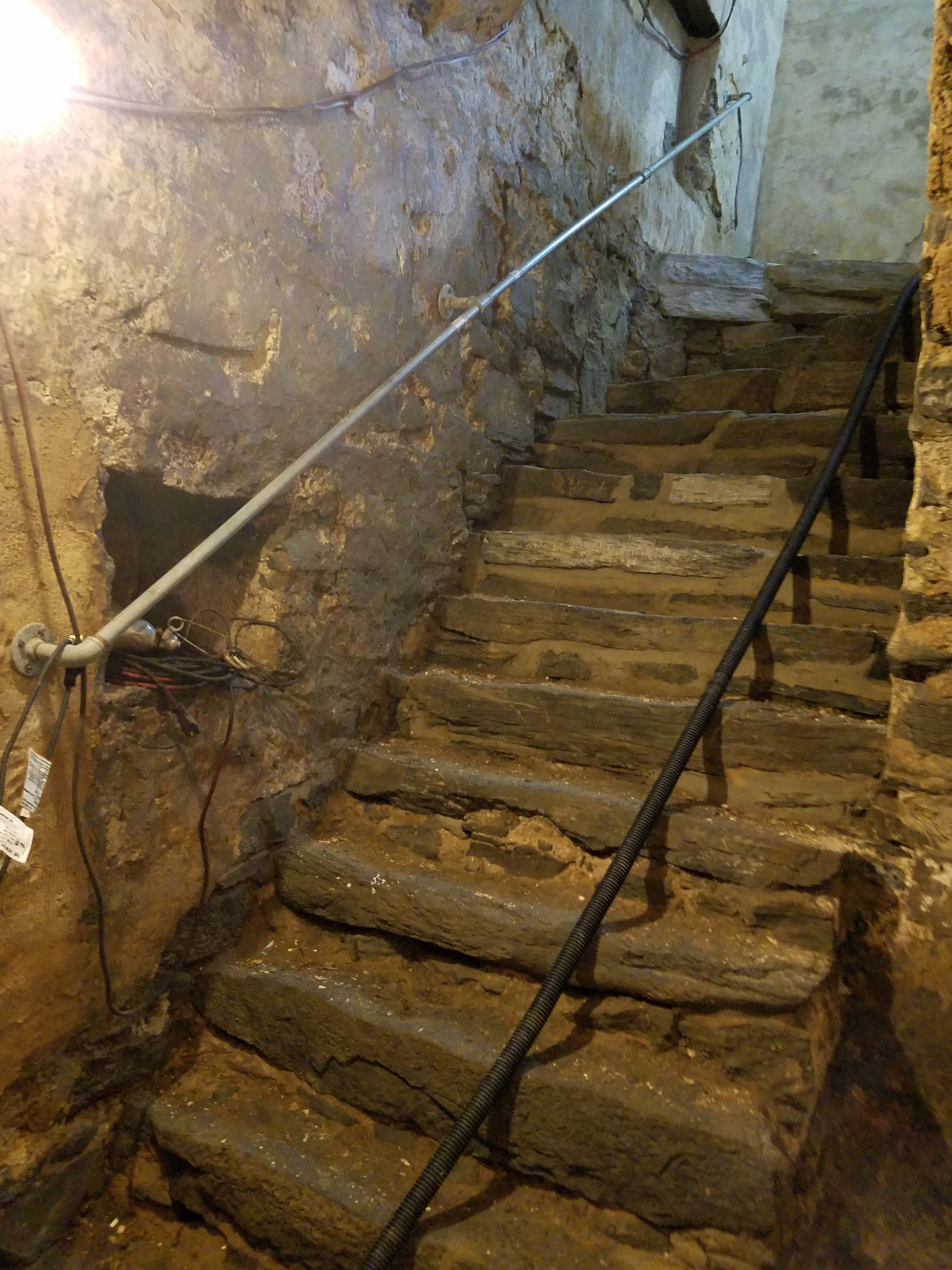
A view of the original limestone steps that lead to the Arched Cellar of Light's Fort.

== Light's Fort during the French and Indian War ==
Since the Lebanon area was a crossroads in the expanding North American frontier, skirmishes with Native Americans did occur. As a precaution, a chain of fortifications, forts and blockhouses was constructed across eastern and central Pennsylvania during the French and Indian War. Strongholds in this area included seven private fortresses: Bethel Moravian Church Fort (Fredericksburg), Benjamin Spycker's Stockade (Jackson Township), George Gloninger's Fort (Pleasant Hill), Isaac Meier Homestead (Myerstown), Light's Fort (Lebanon), Ulrich's Fort (Annville) and Zeller's Fort, known as Heinrich Zeller House (Newmanstown); one fort built by the Pennsylvania Colonial Militia: Fort Swatara (Inwood); and four blockhouses: Adam Harper's (Harper Tavern), Joseph Gibber's (Fredericksburg), Martin Hess’ (Union Township) and Philip Breitenbach's (Myerstown). The Pennsylvania colonial militia used Light's Fort and other strongholds when troops were scouting or deployed in the area.

Most residential buildings during this time were built of logs and did not provide much protection against warfare. The Chestnut Street Log House is an excellent surviving example of how most residential homes were built in this area during the 18th century. The Light's Fort stone construction provided a safe haven for townspeople if any skirmishes with Native Americans occurred.

Light's Fort was a private fort that was not built or funded by the British government or the Pennsylvania colonial militia. The structure was funded and built by John Light (a private citizen and frontier settler). Light built a wooden stockade around the house, with sufficient space for a garden and a livestock pen. With its fourteen-inch thick exterior walls made of limestone and its roof covered with clay tiles to prevent fires from flaming arrows, it stood as a formidable force against Native American attacks. Local settlers and townspeople found shelter in Light's Fort during raids and attacks. The sturdy Light's Fort served as a deterrent against major Native American aggression during the French and Indian War.

== Tunnels ==
The large arched cellar in Light's Fort was used as refuge for townspeople from marauding Native Americans during the French and Indian War. There were tunnels that ran from the Light's Fort cellar for almost a mile. These tunnels were used by nearby townspeople when they had to travel to the safety of Light's Fort during Native American uprisings. The tunnels had two entrance/exit points: one was hidden in a wooded area (near present-day North 10th Street and Willow Street, Lebanon, PA), and it connected to another tunnel in a residential area (near present-day North 8th Street and Cumberland Street, Lebanon, PA). The tunnel network became obsolete after the French and Indian War. In 1818, the original Lebanon County Courthouse was built over one of its entrance/exit points at North 8th Street and Cumberland Street. As late as the 1890s, portions of this tunnel network were still accessible through the basement at Stevens School (present-day Stevens Towers at North 10th Street and Willow Street). Because these tunnels were abandoned, the openings in the Light's Fort cellar walls were closed with limestone blocks and plastered with concrete sometime during the mid to late-1800s. These tunnels have been part of local folklore for many years and mysterious stories about them persist.

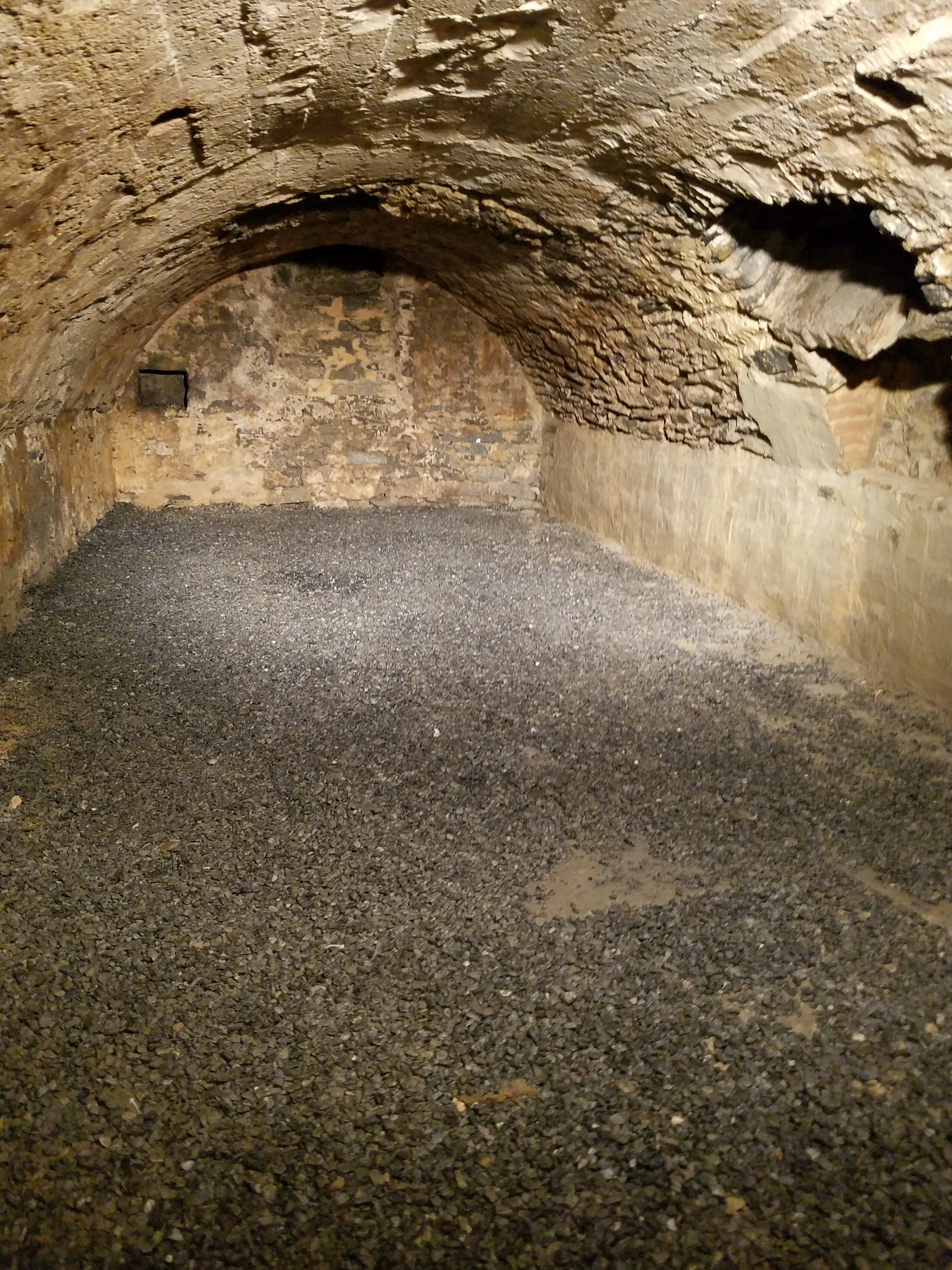
The Arched Cellar in Light's Fort.

== Ghosts of Light's Fort ==
Over the decades many ghost sightings have occurred at Light's Fort. Most notable is the sighting of a Native American girl that was reported by apartment tenants during the 1960s. Historically, there was a foiled Indian attack at Light's Fort in 1757. A local resident named Marcella thought she was doing a good deed on a bitterly cold November night in 1757, when she discovered a crying Native Indian girl outside of Light's Fort, who claimed she was lost from her tribe, cold and hungry. Marcella brought her inside to the kitchen and fed her a hot pork dinner and then took her upstairs to sleep. As the girl laid down on a bed, a tinderbox fell from her clothes. Marcella thought this was odd because she had the ability to light a fire to keep warm, but failed to do so. Now suspicious, Marcella pretended to fall asleep and she soon saw the girl sneaking downstairs so she quietly followed her. The girl went out to the barn and was attempting to set it aflame. Marcella proceeded to knock her unconscious and then called for her father who went out to the barn to investigate the incident. He handed Marcella a hunting knife and told her to finish off the Native Indian girl, which she promptly did. A vacated camp near Light's Fort was soon discovered and it was assumed that the Native Americans realized their plot to raid and burn Light's Fort failed so they fled the area. Another apparition reported at Light's Fort was a man seen on the second floor, dressed in colonial-style clothes. In 2015, a lone workman performing repairs on a warm day reported "cold eerie feelings" while on a ladder.

== Renovations ==
The Historic Preservation Trust of Lebanon County is conducting work in progress restorations to the interior and exterior of Light's Fort. Exterior renovations will include the reconstruction of the portion of the exterior walls and roof that were removed in the 1900s. Old limestone building stones were donated that are currently in storage and will be used to complete the exterior walls. New wood roof rafters will be installed and the roof will be covered with clay tiles to complete the building to its original external configuration. Interior restorations will include the plastering and painting of all interior walls, covering all floors with wood plank boards, replacing current doors and windows with Colonial style products, building solid wood shutters that hinge and swing from the inside on all windows, installing a public accessible restroom on the first floor and rebuilding the fireplace with its original bricks. The end result envisioned will be to make Light's Fort a living museum of United States colonial history.
