= Fort McDowell =

Fort McDowell may refer to:

- Fort McDowell, Angel Island, California
- Fort McDowell, Arizona, (also known as Camp McDowell), a community that started as a US Army fort established in 1865 on the upper Salt River in Maricopa County, Arizona
- Fort McDowell Yavapai Nation of the Yavapai people, near Fountain Hills, Arizona
- McDowell's Mill, sometimes referred to as Fort McDowell, in Franklin County, Pennsylvania
