= Heinrich Zeller House =

Historic house in Pennsylvania, United States

- U.S. National Register of Historic Places
- Pennsylvania state historical marker
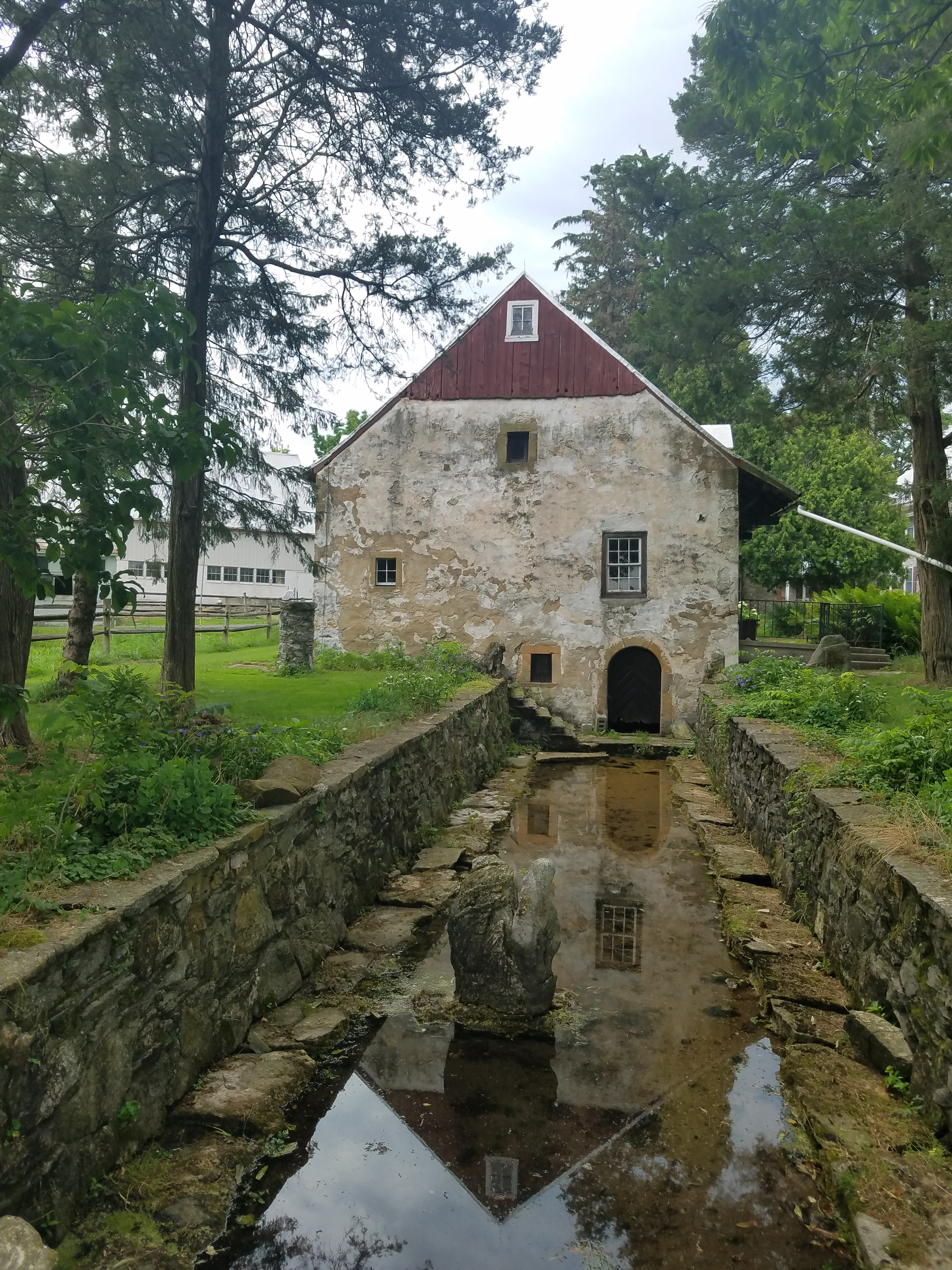
- Fort Zeller - canal and creek view, ca. 2019

- Location within Pennsylvania Location within the United States
- Location: West of Newmanstown off Pennsylvania Route 419, Millcreek Township, Pennsylvania
- Coordinates: 40°20′57″N 76°13′33″W
- Area: 1 acre (0.40 ha)
- Built: 1745
- NRHP reference No.: 75001650

Significant dates
- Added to NRHP: May 12, 1975
- Designated PHMC: March 21, 1947

Heinrich Zeller House, also known as Fort Zeller and Zeller's Fort, is a historic 1 1/2-story building that has served as a fort, block house and residence. The historic structure is located in Millcreek Township, Lebanon County, Pennsylvania.

== Description ==
Zeller's Fort was built in 1745 in the Pennsylvania German Traditional architectural style. The Zeller family, neighbors and the Pennsylvania militia used the fort during the French and Indian War (1754-1763) as refuge and defense against Native American Indian raids. It was actually a fortified house that replaced an earlier log house that was originally built in 1723 near the same location. During the French and Indian War, Lebanon County was susceptible to Native American Indian attacks so many fortifications, forts and blockhouses were constructed in this area. These fortifications included seven private fortresses: Bethel Moravian Church Fort (Fredericksburg), Benjamin Spycker's Stockade (Jackson Township), George Gloninger's Fort (Pleasant Hill), Isaac Meier Homestead (Myerstown), Light's Fort (Lebanon), Ulrich's Fort (Annville) and Zeller's Fort - Heinrich Zeller House (Newmanstown); one fort built by the Pennsylvania Colonial Militia: Fort Swatara (Inwood); and four blockhouses: Adam Harper's (Harper Tavern), Joseph Gibber's (Fredericksburg), Martin Hess’ (Union Township) and Philip Breitenbach's (Myerstown). The Pennsylvania colonial militia used these fortifications during skirmishes or when troops were scouting or deployed in the area.

Fort Zeller has been used as a Zeller family gathering place for more than 200 years.

The structure was built into a bank over an everflowing spring that flows naturally from the bedrock into a creek from an arched opening in the basement. The spring provided fresh drinking water and provided a naturally cool area for storage. The building has an Alsatian / Swiss appearance.

=== Corner Stone and Front Picture Gallery ===
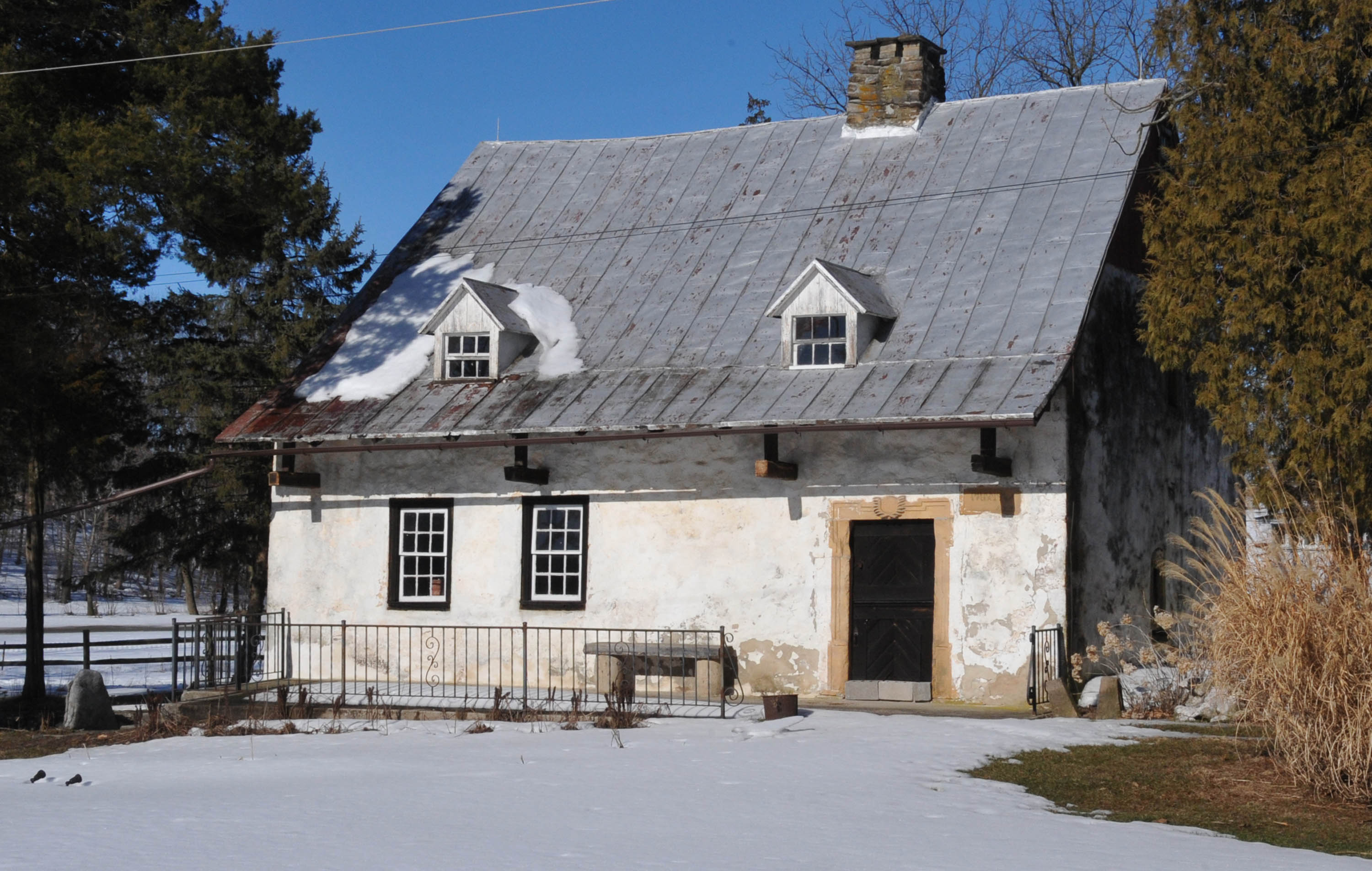
Front Entrance view, ca. 2015

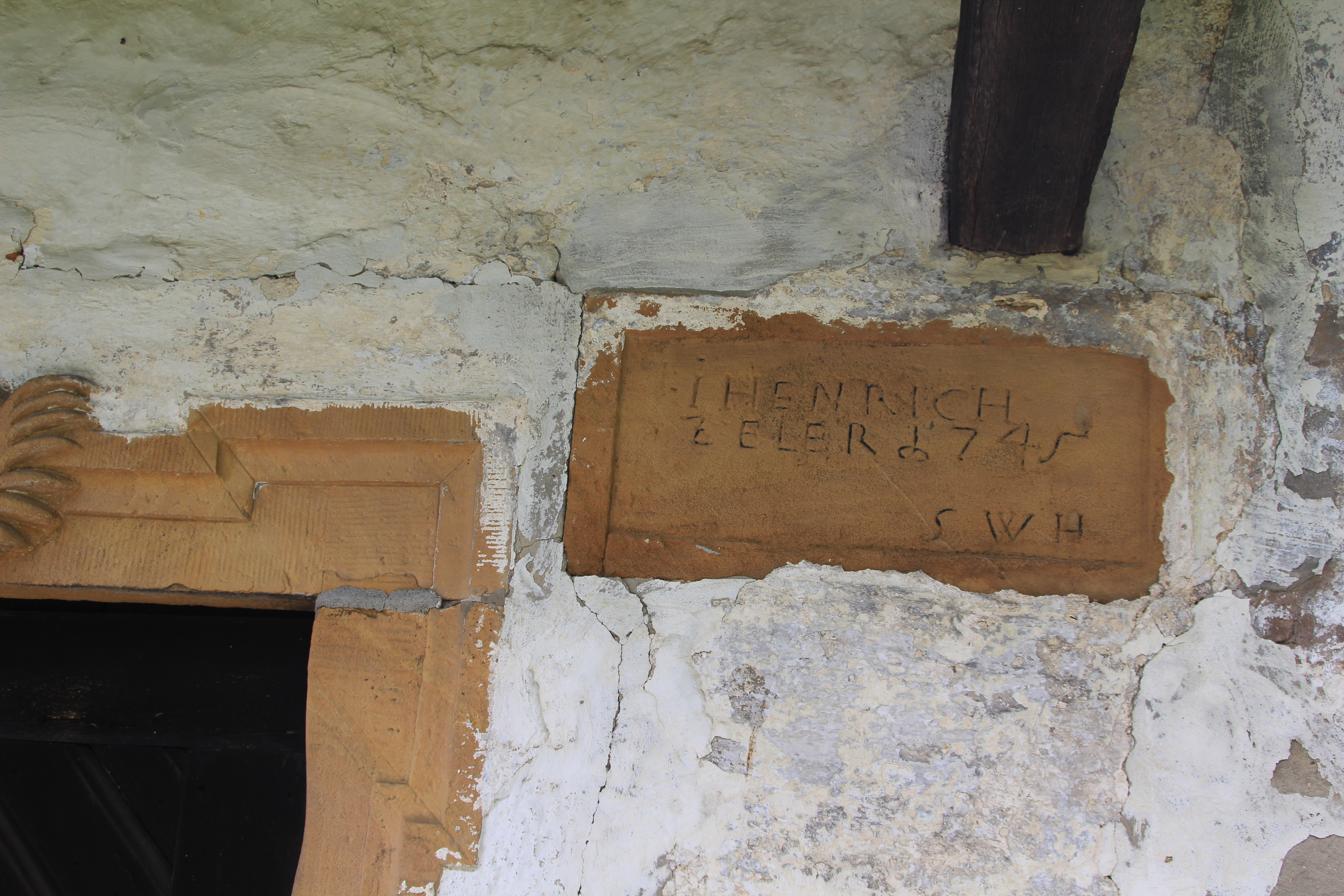
Corner Stone view, ca. 2019

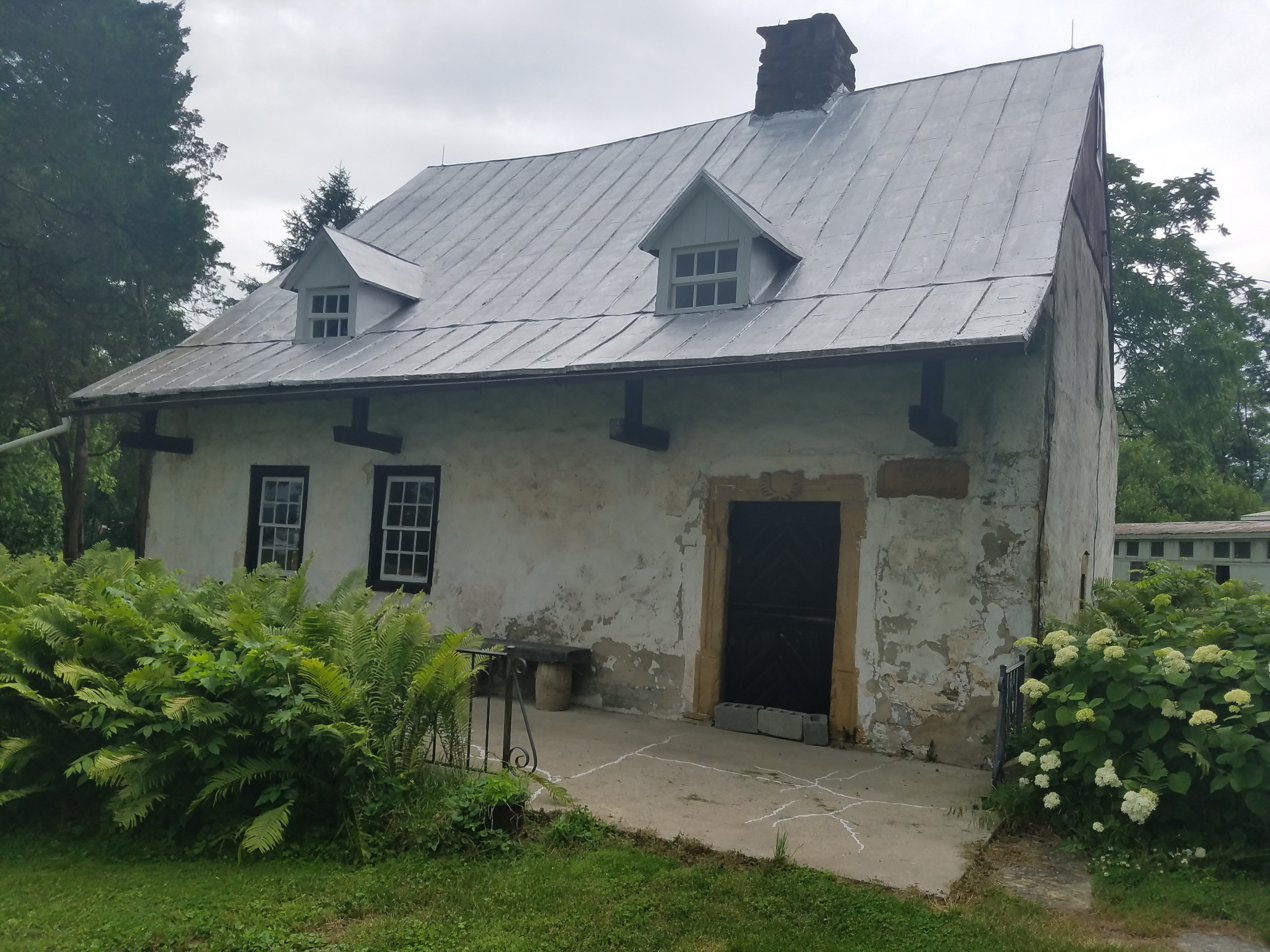
Front Entrance view, ca. 2019

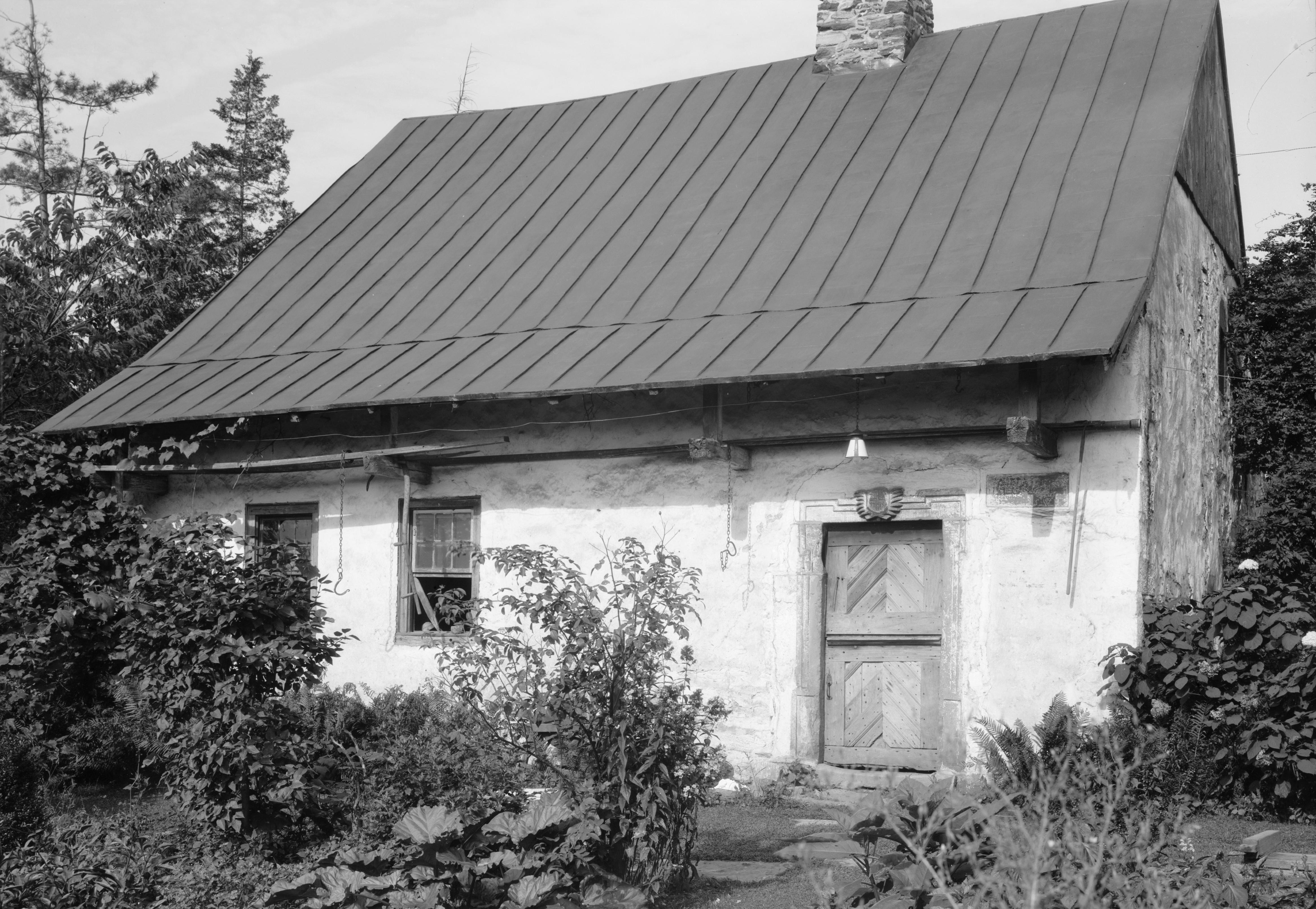
HABS Photo, September 1940

== Interior ==
The first floor includes a twelve foot long fireplace located in the center of the structure which was used for heat and a cooking area, kitchen, living room, storage room and a staircase that leads to the second floor. The original windows included washbasins built into the sills. Water from the spring would flow into the sill and would be used to wash up. A wooden plug was used to allow water to flow into the sill and to exit underneath the window pane. The interior flooring, roofing and walls are framed with heavy timbers. The second floor includes a bedroom, which has the oldest hanging shutter in Pennsylvania.

== Exterior ==
A Zeller family crest (stone carving) hangs over the front door which is also a sign of their faith. The roof is a steep gable style and the original windows were designed for defensive purposes and were narrow and irregularly spaced and measured only twelve by six inches. The exterior walls are constructed of twelve-inch thick limestone covered with stucco.

== Basement ==
There were two original access points to the basement. One was an exterior door that led out in the same direction as the creek, and the second was a trap door located in the floor of the living room. The spring made the basement cool all year and provided cold storage areas for food and water.

=== Exterior Side Views Picture Gallery ===
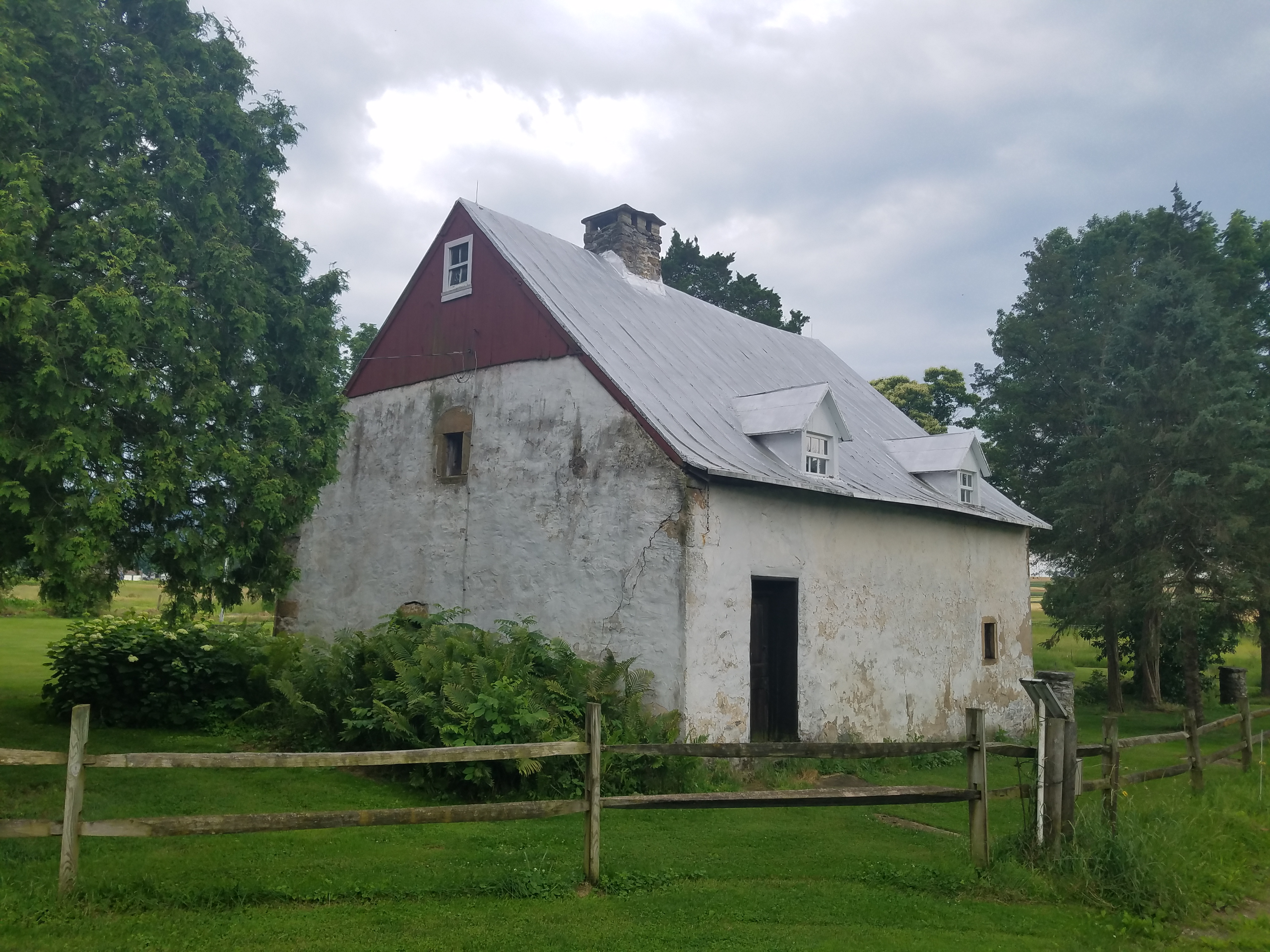
Northwest view, ca. 2019

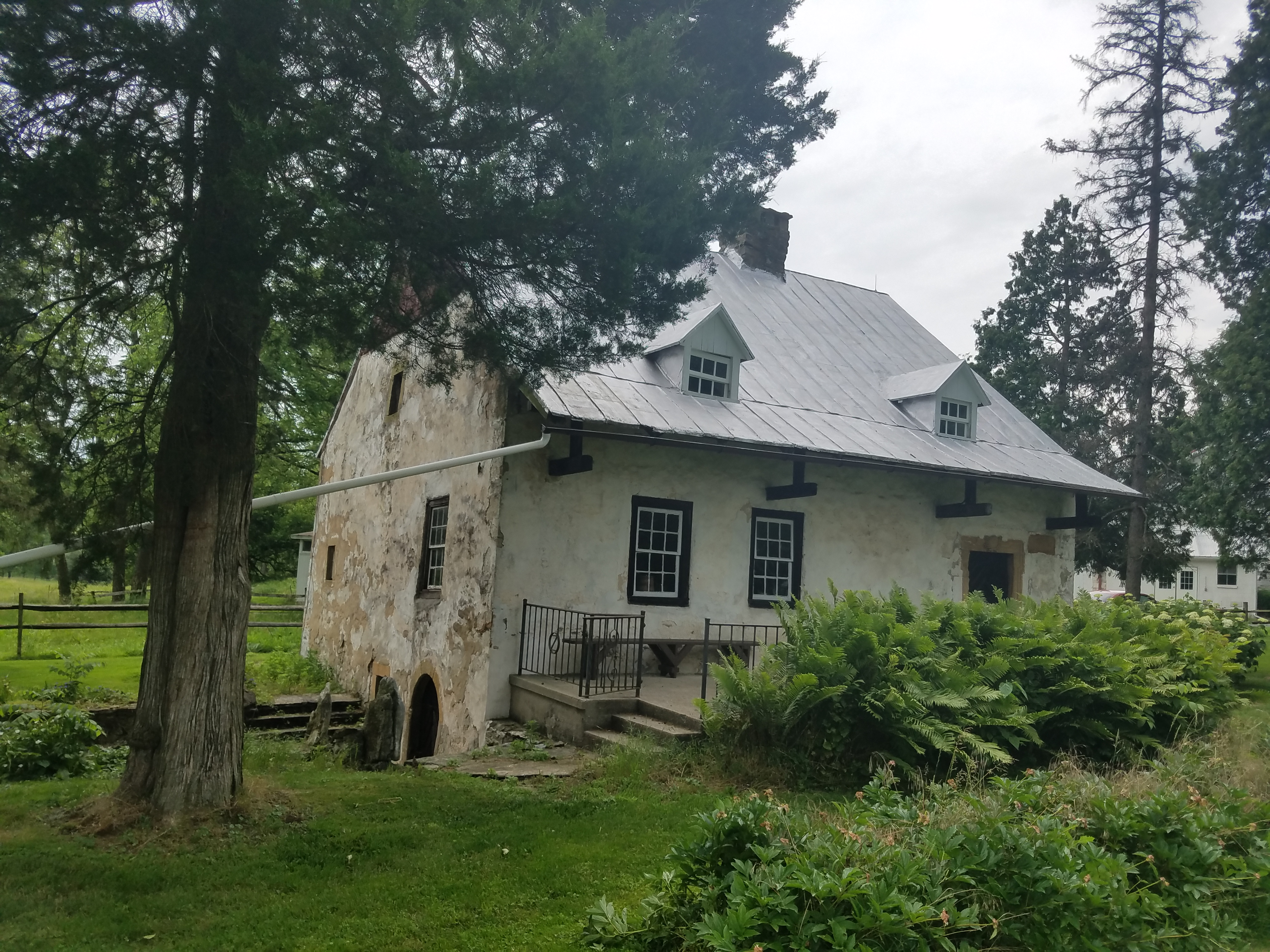
Southeast view, ca. 2019

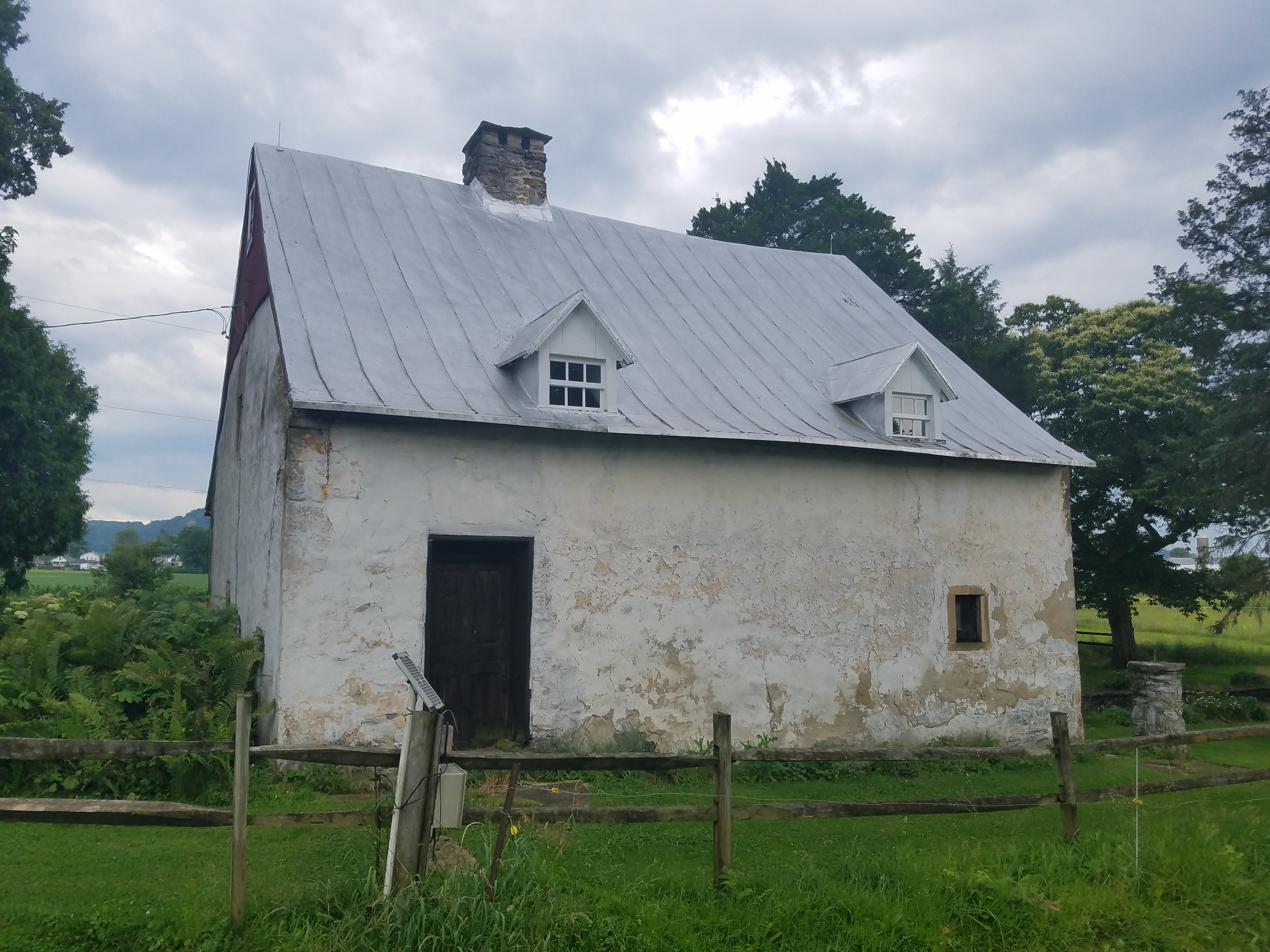
West view, ca. 2019

== Commemorative Plaque ==
At the entrance to Zeller's Fort is a large boulder monument with a commemorative plaque which includes the original documents from the colony. The monument includes the crest, the silhouette of Clothilde Valois de Zeller, and a reproduction of the Zeller land grant.

== National Register of Historic Places ==
Fort Zeller was added to the National Register of Historic Places in 1975.
