= Fort Morris (Pennsylvania) =

18th century fort in colonial Pennsylvania

- Cumberland County, Pennsylvania (present day Shippensburg, Pennsylvania)

Site information
- Type: Military fort
- Controlled by: Privately owned

Location
- Location of Fort Morris in Pennsylvania
- Coordinates: 40°03′12″N 77°30′26″W

Site history
- Built: 1756
- In use: 1756–1759

Garrison information
- Past commanders: James Burd; Captain Hugh Mercer; Lieutenant Thomas Smallman
- Garrison: 30-112 troops

Fort Morris (sometimes referred to as the fort at Shippensburg) was a stockaded blockhouse built in Shippensburg, Pennsylvania during the French and Indian War to protect local settlers from Native American raids. It was also a supply depot for the Pennsylvania militia, and for troops participating in the Forbes Expedition. It was never attacked and was abandoned after 1759, although Edward Shippen III kept the fort maintained for several years in case of another war. It was refurbished during Pontiac's War but was never garrisoned again, and was then used as a residence until it fell into disrepair and was dismantled.

== Background ==
At the beginning of the French and Indian War, Edward Braddock's defeat left Pennsylvania without a professional military force. Lenape chiefs Shingas and Captain Jacobs launched dozens of Shawnee and Delaware raids against British colonial settlements, killing and capturing hundreds of colonists and destroying settlements across western and central Pennsylvania. In late 1755, Colonel John Armstrong wrote to Governor Robert Hunter Morris: "I am of the opinion that no other means of defense than a chain of blockhouses along or near the south side of the Kittatinny Mountains from the Susquehanna to the temporary line, can secure the lives and property of the inhabitants of this country, the new settlements being all fled except Shearman's Valley." Construction on several new forts was begun in December 1755. Governor Robert Hunter Morris was in Shippensburg in July 1755, when he received the news of Braddock's defeat. Morris immediately laid out the ground plan for a fort in the town, and ordered a similar fort to be constructed in neighboring Carlisle.

== History ==
=== Construction ===
Since about 1740, there had been a temporary stockade in Shippensburg for the protection of cattle and provisions, which may have been known as Fort Franklin after 1755, but Shippen wanted a structure that could withstand attack, after a number of Native American raids in the area. In July 1755, Charles Swaine cleared the ground for the fort and started digging the fort's well, and in August, Shippen's son-in-law James Burd was assigned to supervise construction of the fort. Shippen donated land for the fort, but funding, supplies and troops for the garrison were not immediately available. In November 1755, the Great Cove massacre and the Gnadenhütten massacre increased the pressure on the Pennsylvania provincial government to provide protection for settlers, and a detachment of 30 men was sent to begin construction. Local settlers assisted in the construction, and on November 2, Burd wrote: "We have one hundred men working at Fort Morris, with heart and hand every day." In January 1756, Burd was temporarily assigned to Fort Granville, which delayed construction further.

William Eyre, a military engineer assigned to advise on the construction of forts, saw the half-finished Fort Morris in February 1756 and described it as "a small Fort made of Stockades, but no one in it. A Well [inside is] seventy Feet deep, and very good Water; it stands high." Frustrated with repeated delays, the people of Shippensburg petitioned the governor in September to be allowed to complete construction themselves, in a petition titled "Another Petition from the Inhabitants of Shippensburg and adjacent Townships setting forth their miserable condition and offering to finish a Fort already begun by the late Governor if they shall be allowed Men and Ammunition to defend it." In late September, a company of 100 troops under the command of Hugh Mercer was sent to garrison the fort, which was now habitable. In November, Shippen and Burd decided on the name "Fort Morris," to honor the Pennsylvania governor, Robert Hunter Morris.

=== Description ===
In August 1758, General John Forbes described the fort as "a regular Square with four Bastions, and one Gate in that Curtain which fronts due East towards the Town." He adds, "There are three Swivel Guns on the salient Angles of the SE, SW, and NW Bastions, but none on the NE." A plan of the fort depicts it as a square about 180 feet on each side, with four bastions, enclosing an officer's quarters, three barracks, a storehouse and a guardhouse.

=== Command and garrison ===
James Burd was in command during construction, until Captain Hugh Mercer took command of Fort Morris in September 1756. Mercer was promoted to major in December 1757. As of February 1758, the garrison consisted of two companies totaling 112 men. Mercer was promoted to colonel in May 1758, and he and part of the garrison were transferred, in preparation for the Forbes Expedition. Lieutenant Thomas Smallman remained in command of a small garrison until the fort was abandoned in 1759.

=== Later years ===
By 1761 the fort was deteriorating, but Shippen urged the townspeople to maintain it, writing on March 24: "I desire everybody in Shippensburg to take care of ye Fort for I will not suffer a Log of it to be thrown down on any pretence Whatever." At the beginning of Pontiac's War, Shippen petitioned for a new garrison for the fort, and was denied. In 1764, Shippen purchased two cannons for the fort and had a drainage ditch dug outside the stockade.

A storehouse, possibly a gunpowder magazine as it had stone walls two feet thick, remained standing for years after the stockade was torn down, and was still in use as a rented home as of 1781. This building was demolished in 1836. The fort's well was still in use as of 1871.

== Archaeological excavations ==
Archaeologists began examining documents in 2004 in an effort to pinpoint the fort's location. In 2009, the State Museum of Pennsylvania began conducting surveys to determine the exact location of the fort. Historically, there has been some confusion over Fort Morris and the temporary stockade known as Fort Franklin.

Between 2009 and 2012, over 23,000 18th-century artifacts probably associated with the fort were recovered, including ceramics, gun parts, 30 musket balls, a dozen flints, hundreds of pottery shards, buttons, cuff links, belt-buckles and boot-buckles, a ladle for pouring molten lead into shot molds, eating utensils, large and intact pieces of dinnerware, a damaged firing mechanism from a flintlock, and a copper half-penny bearing the likeness of King George II, dated 1754. The surveys also identified subsurface features possibly associated with the fort, including a foundation, a stone-and-clay oven, a root cellar and signs of rats that raided foodstuffs.

== Memorialization ==
A historical marker was placed on King Street (U.S. Route 11 in Pennsylvania) in Shippensburg in 1921 by the Pennsylvania Historical Commission and the Civic Club of Shippensburg. It is a brass plaque attached to a stone wall, and reads: "This Tablet Marks the Site of Fort Morris. Erected in November 1755 by Col. James Burd and used as one of the chain of forts to protect the frontiers during the period of Indian hostility following the defeat of General Edward Braddock."

A second marker was placed near the site of the fort in 1961 by the Pennsylvania Historical and Museum Commission. It reads: "Named for Gov. R. H. Morris, and built by local settlers under the supervision of James Burd after Braddock's defeat in July, 1755. Later garrisoned by provincial troops commanded by Hugh Mercer. The fort site, long marked by the soldiers' well, lies a block to the north on Burd Street."

A third marker consisting of a stone tablet with a bronze plaque, was placed at the site of the fort in 2018 by the Shippensburg Historical Society. It reads: "Constructed under the direction of Colonel James Burd. One of a chain of forts erected on the Pennsylvania frontier following Edward Braddock's defeat of July 1755. Serving as a garrison and a refuge for area settlers during the French and Indian War and Pontiac's Uprising."

A historical marker for Fort Franklin, located on King Street, reads: "Near this point stood a log fort erected about 1740 by early settlers, against Indian raids. It was superseded by Fort Morris, erected in 1755."
