= Clothilde de Valois Zeller =

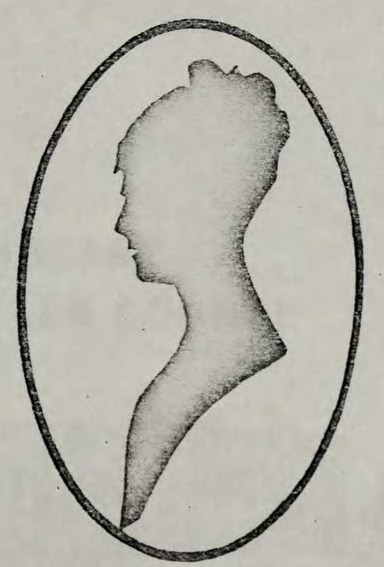
- Died: 1749

Lady Clothilde de Valois Zeller (c. 1660 – 1749) was a Pennsylvania pioneer woman whose sons constructed Fort Zeller. Purportedly a Huguenot countess who fled France, Zeller descendants honor her as their family matriarch while a number of scholars, including some Zeller descendants, contend she never existed.

According to family tradition, Countess Clothilde de Valois de Reni was born around 1660 and was a member of the royal House of Valois. She married a scholar named Jacques de Sellaire in Holland after they fled France following the revocation of the Edict of Nantes in 1685 which guaranteed religious freedom to the Protestant Huguenots. After some time in England, she arrived in New York in 1710, with her husband having died either in England or at sea. She and her sons eventually settled in Pennsylvania around 1723 and constructed Fort Zeller in present day Lebanon County, Pennsylvania.

Zeller family boosters promoted the family tradition of Lady Clothilde de Valois Zeller. Chief among them was Frank M. Zeller, a lumberman, whose genealogical research was published in the Compendium of American Genealogy (1925-1942) and the Armorial Families of America (1929), complete with a family crest he purchased from the Wanamaker's department store. Zeller descendants zealously promoted this story, installing a plaque honoring her at Fort Zeller with a silhouette of her of unknown origin. One Zeller descendant had an angry correspondence with poet Wallace Stevens, another Zeller descendant, when he expressed skepticism about her royal origins.

Genealogist Jane Bottorff, a Zeller descendant, pointed out the lack of any "solid documentation" regarding Lady Clothilde and thought that "it is more likely that she is a totally fictitious character." Dr. George Elmore Reaman, in his On the Trail of the Huguenots, bluntly wrote that her story was "nonsense" and that "Clothilde de Valois Zeller never existed."
