= Fort Chambers (Pennsylvania) =

- Chambersburg, Pennsylvania

Site information
- Type: Military fort
- Controlled by: Chambersburg Recreation Department

Location
- Location of Fort Chambers in Pennsylvania
- Coordinates: 39°56′15″N 77°39′40″W

Site history
- Built: 1756
- In use: 1756-1764
- Battles/wars: French and Indian War

Garrison information
- Past commanders: Colonel Benjamin Chambers
- Garrison: Local settlers

Pennsylvania Historical Marker
- Designated: 1947

Fort Chambers, often referred to as Chambers' Fort, was a privately-built and garrisoned fort built during the French and Indian War to protect residents of Chambersburg, Pennsylvania. The fort was built in 1756 by Benjamin Chambers at his own expense, initially just to safeguard Chambers' property and family, but it later became a refuge for local settlers. The fort was never attacked and was probably dismantled in 1764.

== History ==
Chambers immigrated from Ireland before 1730 and established a farm at the confluence of Falling Spring and Conococheague Creek. He built a sawmill and a grist mill, and soon a community began to form. In 1734, he received a "Blunston license" for 400 acres (160 ha), from a representative of the Penn family. Chambers traded with Native Americans and was considered their friend and ally. In 1747, during King George's War, Benjamin Franklin raised a militia called "the Association for General Defense" because the legislators of Philadelphia had decided to take no action to defend the city "either by erecting fortifications or building Ships of War." Franklin raised money to pay local officers to recruit volunteer militia companies for the defense of Pennsylvania communities. Benjamin Chambers had been a colonel in the Associators, and retained the title of "colonel" thereafter.

On October 30 1755, Sheriff John Potter held a meeting in Shippensburg, at which it was decided to build or fortify four forts in the area, one of which was at Chambers' mills. On November 25, four swivel guns in addition to powder and lead were delivered, for use by Chambers and at McDowell's Mill. Two of these guns were taken by Chambers.

=== Construction ===
1770 map of the Province of Pennsylvania showing "Chamber's T.", the location of Fort Chambers, on the map's lower edge, at the center left, southwest of Shippensburg.

In "the winter and spring of 1756," Chambers built a large stockade to protect his farm and mills, and constructed a main interior building of stone, two stories in height, with small windows. Several of the buildings were roofed with lead plates to make them fireproof. The two 4-pounder swivel guns were mounted at corners of the stockade. The fort was constructed on the bank of Conococheague Creek, where it meets Falling Spring, and the stockade enclosed the mouth of the spring. The garrison was composed of local settlers.

Aside from the two swivel guns, Chambers never requested or received any assistance from the Pennsylvania Provincial Government. Chambers himself wrote, as part of a petition in 1768:

"I built a Large Stockeaid fort when the war broke out wherein is a marchant mill and water at will, So that Sir John St Cleair (quartermaster general) gave his Judgment that it was the most defensabel fort on the fronteers. I with the assistance of as many of the melishia as would venture to stay with me kept Said fort without aney Expence to the king or provance dureing the war."

=== Guns dispute ===
Commissary General James Young raised concerns about the swivel guns at Chambers' fort after visiting it in October 1756, writing:

"In our journey to Fort Lyttleton we stopped at Mr. Chamber's Mill, 10 miles beyond Shippensburg, towards Mckdowels, where he has a good Private Fort, and on an Exceeding good situation to be made very Defenceable; but what I think of great Consequence to the Government is, that in said Fort are two four Pound Cannon mounted, and no body but a few Country People to defend it. If the Enemy should take that Fort they would naturally bring those Cannon against Shippensburg and Carlisle, I therefor Presume to recommend it to your Honor, Either to have the Cannon taken from thence, or a proper Garrison Stationed there."

Governor Robert Hunter Morris ordered Lieutenant Colonel John Armstrong to take custody of the guns, but Chambers went to Philadelphia in December to appeal to Governor Morris. On February 4 1757, the Governor ordered Armstrong "to cause the said two Cannon to be removed from the dwelling House of the said Benjamin Chambers, to Shippensburg or some other Fort." But when Lieutenant Thomas Smallman arrived with troops, Chambers and "divers other Persons unknown, armed with Swords, Guns, and other Warlike weapons" prevented them from taking the guns. On April 5 the Governor ordered Sheriff William Parker to arrest Chambers. Several county magistrates resigned in protest, and on June 30, 1757 Armstrong proposed that the Governor advise Colonel John Stanwix of the King's Royal Rifle Corps to seize the guns, but no action was taken.

At least one of the two swivel guns was still in Chambersburg 73 years later, when it was fired during Independence Day celebrations on July 4, 1830.

=== Later years ===
Chambers was active in responding to Native American attacks in the area. Some of Chambers' militia joined Captain Culbertson in pursuit of the warriors who captured McCord's Fort in April 1756, and Ensign John Reynolds of Chambers' militia was among those killed in the Battle of Sideling Hill on April 4 1756. Colonel Henry Bouquet visited the fort in July 1759, and sent four letters from "Chambers's Fort," or "Fort Chamber's."

After the end of Pontiac's War, the fort was probably dismantled when Chambers laid out the plan for the town of Chambersburg. He donated land for the Falling Spring Presbyterian Church cemetery, where he was buried after his death in 1788.

== Memorialization ==
A historical marker was placed in 1947 on West King Street (just half a block off U.S. Route 11 in Pennsylvania) by the Pennsylvania Historical and Museum Commission.

A stone tablet with a brass plaque was placed near the site of the fort in 1984, also on King Street, by the Kittochtinny Historical Society, Franklin County Chapter, DAR. It reads: "Southwest 150 Feet, erected 1755-56 by Colonel Benjamin Chambers, founder of Chambersburg, a two-story stone structure surrounded by a moat. A stockade manned by two swivel guns enclosed the fort, flour mill, sawmill, and dwelling."

The site of the fort is now the Chambers Fort Park. In 2008, a bronze life-sized statue named "The Homecoming" was installed in the park, depicting the 1781 return of Chambers' son James and grandson Benjamin from their service in the American Revolutionary War.
