= Markes, Pennsylvania =

Unincorporated community in Pennsylvania, U.S.

Coordinates: 39°52′28″N 77°52′18″W

Markes is an unincorporated community in Peters Township, Franklin County, in the U.S. state of Pennsylvania.

== History ==
A variant name was "Bridgeport". The first settlement at the town site was made as early as 1830. The name of the post office was changed to Markes in 1891, and the post office was discontinued in 1915.
