= McDowell's Mill =

18th century fort in Pennsylvania

- near Markes, in Franklin County, Pennsylvania, USA

Site information
- Type: Fortified homestead
- Controlled by: Commonwealth of Pennsylvania

Location
- Location of McDowell's Mill in Pennsylvania
- Coordinates: 39°52′28″N 77°52′18″W

Site history
- Built: 1755
- In use: 1755-1757
- Battles/wars: French and Indian War

Garrison information
- Past commanders: Captain John Potter
- Garrison: 47-100 men plus officers

Pennsylvania Historical Marker
- Designated: October 05, 1916; May 27, 1947

McDowell's Mill, often referred to as McDowell's Fort, or Fort McDowell, was a privately-built and garrisoned stockaded blockhouse, built in 1755 in Pennsylvania and fortified in early 1756 during the French and Indian War. While it was a small, poorly built structure, it was the center of several notable events during the war. Even after it was superseded by Fort Loudoun in 1756, McDowell's Mill was garrisoned and served as an outpost until April 1757. After Pontiac's War it was abandoned, but the stockade stood until 1840.

== History ==
The one-and-a-half-story wooden mill was built before 1754 by John McDowell, who had established a homestead nearby in 1740.

It first appears in historical documents in a letter of June, 1755 from Governor Robert Hunter Morris to General Braddock, in which Morris proposes using the mill to store supplies for Braddock's upcoming expedition: "Mr. Peters, who in his Way from the Camp came through Cumberland County, judges that a Place called McDowell's Mill, situate upon the new Road about twenty Miles Westward of Shippensburg, is much more convenient for the Magazine than Shippensburg." In July, he wrote: "I shall form the Magazine at or near McDowalls Mill, and put some stucado's round it to protect the Magazine...I send you the plan of the fort or stockado, which I shall make by setting logs of about ten feet long in the ground, so as to inclose the store houses. I think to place two swivel guns, in two of the opposite bastions, which will be sufficient to guard against any attacks of small arms."

Edward Shippen III later wrote suggesting that a small garrison of "20 or 30 soldiers" be assigned to guard the mill. The mill was located on the east bank of the west branch of Conococheague Creek near present-day Markes, Pennsylvania. It occupied a strategic location near a pass in the Kittatinny Mountains.

=== Construction ===
1759 map of the Province of Pennsylvania, by Nicholas Scull II, showing "McDowell's" in the left lower panel, just below Fort Loudoun.

Plans to store supplies in the mill were discarded after Braddock's defeat in July, 1755. Following the attacks at Penn's Creek, Great Cove, and Gnadenhütten in late 1755, however, local settlers decided to fortify the mill themselves. William Maxwell (a survivor of the Braddock Expedition) formed a company of militia at Peters Township and began construction of the stockade on November 3 1755. John Craig of Peters Township wrote that "after the Murders committed by the Indians in the Great Cove, he and the other Inhabitants of Peters Township contiguous to McDowells Mill erected a Fort which included the Mill and with it several little Houses that they built themselves and retired into it with their Families." On November 25, four swivel guns, in addition to powder and lead, were delivered to Franklin County, and two of the guns were sent to McDowell's Mill.

=== Military history ===
On February 29 1756, a war party of eighty Lenape warriors led by Shingas and Captain Jacobs attacked the mill but were driven off by a party of forty-six men from Peters Township and by a detachment (a hundred men from Conrad Weiser's 1st Battalion) under Captain John Potter, who by now had taken command of the fort. About 40 local residents had taken refuge in the fort, according to John Craig, who was captured by the Indians and later escaped. Fourteen men sent by George Croghan went out to find the Indians and attacked them during the night, when the warriors were standing around a campfire.

The Pennsylvania Gazette reported on March 18, 1756 that Croghan's men retreated after the warriors "ran directly to the Place from which the Soldiers fired, and briskly fired on the Soldiers, kill[ing] one of them." Reportedly, the warriors were armed with guns taken from Braddock's troops in July, as five of these rifles were found after the attack. The next day, the warriors assaulted the mill again, and "in ten Minutes the Indians had surrounded the fort, and skulking in a great Thicket...fired many shot[s] at our men, who were looking over the wall, and...returned the fire." The warriors would have captured the mill, but a blizzard interrupted the attack.

By the end of March, McDowell's Mill had become a military headquarters, as indicated by correspondence. In April, Lenape warriors captured Fort McCord, another private fort, and took prisoner the 27 women and children who had taken refuge there. A militia company pursued them but was forced to retreat after suffering casualties at the Battle of Sideling Hill. Captain John Potter, commander at McDowell's Mill, was criticized for not responding sooner to these attacks, and the local populace demanded military protection.

Sporadic attacks on settlements in Franklin County continued through the summer, and the capture of Fort Granville on July 31 led many settlers to flee. Captain Potter reported on August 18 that his garrison consisted of 47 men. Lieutenant Colonel John Armstrong felt that McDowell's Mill would not withstand an attack, writing on August 20: "McDowel's...is a necessary Post, but the present Fort not defencible." In the Kittanning Expedition in September, a few prisoners were rescued, Captain Jacobs was killed, and the Lenape village of Kittanning was destroyed.

In November 1756, a settler named Samuel Perry and a young boy, possibly his son, were ambushed outside the fort and Perry was later found killed and scalped. A patrol sent to find the boy was also ambushed; four soldiers were killed and two were taken captive. Colonel Armstrong wrote to the governor that "this misfortune is happen'd thro' the weakness of the Garrison," arguing that a larger fort would protect the populace more effectively.

=== Abandonment, 1757 ===
The destruction of Kittanning relieved some of the pressure on provincial forces, and in December 1756 construction was initiated on Fort Loudoun, a formal military base about two miles north, intended to replace McDowell's Mill. By December 22, Fort Loudoun was nearing completion and supplies and ammunition had been transferred from McDowell's Mill. The mill was abandoned by the end of that year.

However, in early 1757, continued attacks and rumors of French troops in Bedford County led Armstrong to send a detachment of troops from Fort Swatara to garrison McDowell's Mill again. They found the mill in poor condition and "everything in ruin." Delays in paying the men added to their discontent, and the garrison was transferred to Fort Loudoun in April. In July 1763, Colonel Henry Bouquet wrote to Governor James Hamilton suggesting that McDowell's Mill be refurbished, but no action was taken.

John McDowell, who had built the mill, served as Captain lieutenant and surgeon during the American Revolutionary War. The mill and its stockade remained standing until 1840.

== Memorialization ==
A historical marker, consisting of a brass plaque mounted on a stone tablet, was erected in Peters Township in 1916 by the Pennsylvania Historical and Museum Commission, the Enoch Brown Association, and the Descendants of John McDowell. A second marker was placed nearby in 1947 by the Pennsylvania Historical and Museum Commission.
