= Fort Swatara =

French and Indian War fort in Pennsylvania, U.S.

- Also known as Smith’s Fort.
- Along Fort Swatara Drive about 1.5 miles north of Lickdale, Lebanon County, Pennsylvania. Near Lickdale, Pennsylvania (Formerly known as Union Forge) in United States
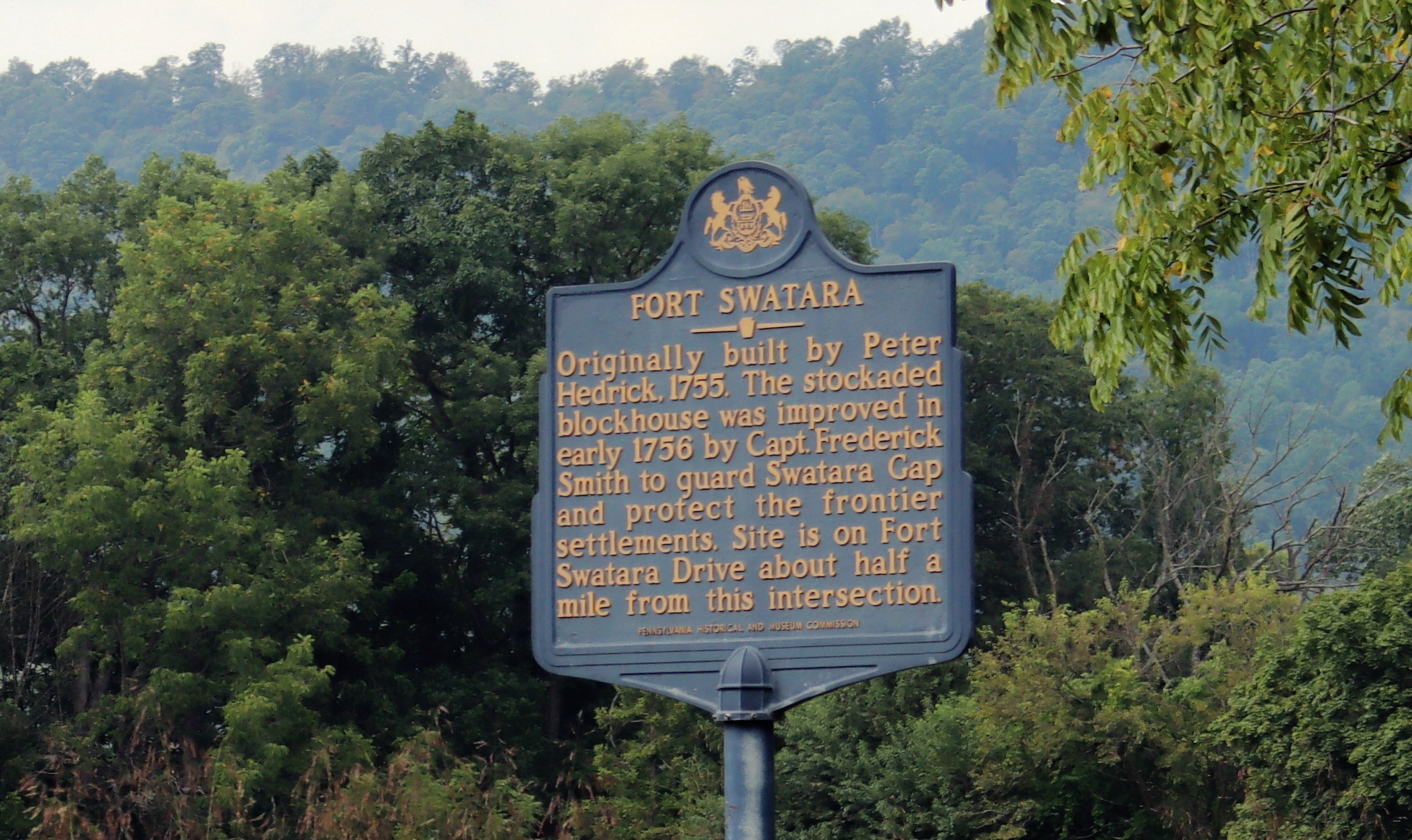
- Fort Swatara, Pennsylvania Historical Marker

Site information
- Condition: destroyed

Location
- Location of Fort Swatara Fort Swatara (the United States)
- Coordinates: 40°34′0″N 76°41′1″W

Site history
- Built: 1755 (Rebuilt by the Colonial Pennsylvania militia forces in 1756)
- Built by: Colonial Pennsylvania militia forces
- In use: 1755-1758
- Materials: Logs and roughly sawed wood boards.
- Fate: Abandoned in 1758 – materials likely pillaged by local European settlers.
- Events: Fort Swatara prevented marauding Indian raids from progressing to the more populated areas in what is now Lebanon County, Pennsylvania.

Garrison information
- Past commanders: Captain Christian Busse; Captain Frederick Smith (Schmitt); Lieutenant Phillip Martzloff; Captain Lieutenant Samuel Weiser; Captain Lieutenant Samuel Allen
- Garrison: Pennsylvania militia, 30-50 men plus officers

Pennsylvania Historical Marker
- Designated: 1999

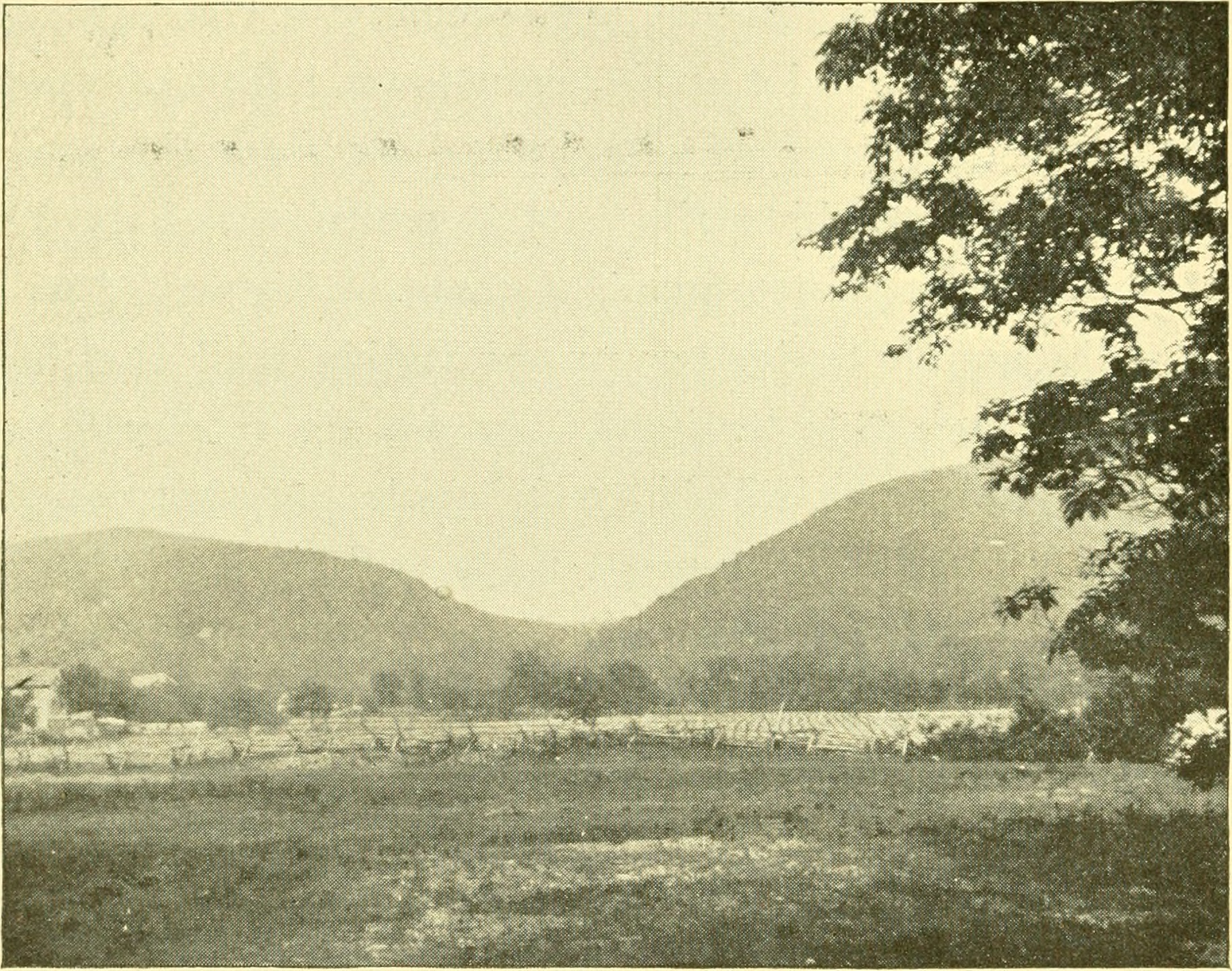
Photograph of the Swatara Gap taken in 1895.

Fort Swatara (various spellings, sometimes referred to as Smith's Fort) was a stockaded blockhouse built during the French and Indian War in what is now Lebanon County, Pennsylvania. Initially a farmstead surrounded by a stockade, provincial troops occupied it in January 1756. The fort safeguarded local farms, but a number of settlers were killed by small Native American war parties. The fort was abandoned in May 1758.

== History ==
In 1755, during the French and Indian War, marauding Indians allied with the French attacked European settlers along the Blue Mountains of Pennsylvania near the Swatara Gap area. Peter Hedrick and other Swatara Gap area settlers fortified Hedrick's farmstead by building a log-walled stockade around it. On January 25, 1756, Captain Christian Busse received orders from Robert Hunter Morris, deputy governor of the Province of Pennsylvania, to occupy the existing fortification at Hedrick's farmstead and reinforce it if necessary. He also gave orders for the construction of Fort Manada, and for regular patrols to monitor the land between these forts and the nearby Fort Lebanon. Morris wrote:

"You are as soon as Possible to Proceed with the Company under your command to the gap at Tolehaio, where Swehatara comes through the Mountain, and in some convenient place there you are to erect a Fort, of the form and dimensions herewith given you, unless you shall Judge the Staccado [stockade], already erected there, conveniently placed, in which case you shall take possession of it, and make such additional works as you may think necessary to render it sufficiently strong and defenceable."

=== Location ===
The fort was built near Swatara Gap, at a point where the Swatara Creek passes south between the ridges of Sharp Mountain and Second Mountain (present-day Swatara State Park). Swatara Gap is sometimes referred to by another Native American name, Tolehaio or Tolihaio. Local settlers occasionally referred to the gap as "the Hole." "Swatara" comes from a Susquehannock word, Swahadowry or Schaha-dawa, which means "where we feed on eels". Ancient Native Americans built dozens of eel-weirs, V-shaped rock barriers at shallow points in the river, designed to funnel eels into a trap, on the Susquehanna River and its tributaries.

=== Construction ===
Busse's troops, under the command of Captain Frederick Smith (Friedrich Schmitt), erected a military-style log blockhouse and gunpowder magazine shed for ammunition storage and surrounded the structures with a sturdy log stockade. The fort was sometimes referred to as "Smith's Fort."

On May 28, 1756, Major William Parsons visited the fort and wrote a detailed description of it to Lieutenant Colonel Conrad Weiser:

"The Fort is pretty well built and kept clean & there is convenient Room to parade and exercise the Men within it. The Water of an adjacent Spring is convey'd through the Fort by a Canal which is very commodious. There are, however, some objections to the Fort viz: There is a large Barn and dwelling House, of Peter Heidrick, within the Fort; the Barn is covered with Straw & might easily be set on Fire from without; and being large it is very much incommodes the Fort. There are also several small Buildings without, which join to the Fort and serve as Bastions to it; which as I apprehend might also be set on Fire from without, which would be fatal to the Garrison in Case of an Attack."

Weiser visited the fort in September and agreed with this assessment, writing:

"The fort at Suatara, Comonly Called Smiths fort, is in a very poor Condition. [It] may be set on fire by three or four of the Indians...In one [end] is an old Barn full of Corn & hay...and on the other end is an old log house of unhewn logs...the Barn and house might be set on fire very easely fro[m] the out side and the garrison which Consists of 30 men Smoked out of it and destroyed."

Recommendations were made to rebuild the fort or to remove the buildings which made it vulnerable, but for unknown reasons they were never implemented.

=== Garrison and command ===
Governor Morris initially sent fifty men to build the fort, but 21 of these were then sent to Fort Manada, eight were sent to protect settlers working in nearby farm fields, eight to patrol western areas near the fort, and sixteen were sent to guard settlers that were living in close proximity to the fort. In September 1756, Conrad Weiser observed a garrison of 30 men plus officers, and a report in November lists 32 men. In February 1758, Adjutant Jacob Kern found a garrison of 33 men plus officers, although during the same month Commissary General James Young counted 46 men and Lieutenant Colonel James Burd noted 38 men. Numbers of troops tended to vary as many soldiers signed up for short-term enlistments of a few months rather than the standard 3-year term. Troops were frequently sent as escorts for supplies, prisoners or dignitaries, and war and illness were constant sources of attrition.

The fort had five commanding officers during the two and a half years of its existence. Captain Frederick Smith (Friedrich Schmitt), who supervised the fort's construction, proved to be abusive and negligent in communicating with his superiors. In July 1756, there were complaints about Smith's conduct, although Colonel Weiser wrote to the governor that "when the People about Swataro and the Hole heard of Capt Smiths being accused for neglect of Duty, they wrote a Letter to me in his Favour." In July 1757, Weiser himself expressed annoyance that soldiers at Swatara, whose term of enlistment had expired, were not being re-enlisted. He wrote to Deputy Governor Denny: "I wish your Honour had Sent his [Smith's] discharge, he wont inlist the men anew, and by all what I Can learn abuses the officers under him, and has never Sent me a Journal nor Muster Roll. The lieut and Insign Complains bitterly against [him]." In August, Smith was dismissed and replaced by Lieutenant Phillip Martzloff. In October, Martzloff was temporarily transferred to Fort Hunter, whose commanding officer was ill, and Fort Swatara fell under the command of Captain Lieutenant Samuel Weiser, son of Colonel Conrad Weiser, until December, when Martzloff returned. Colonel Weiser then learned that soldiers whose enlistment was ending would not re-enlist under Martzloff, and he was quickly replaced by Captain Lieutenant Samuel Allen.

=== Skirmishes near Fort Swatara ===
Early in the French and Indian War, several skirmishes occurred near Fort Swatara between Native Americans and Pennsylvania militiamen.

In July 1756, two settlers were killed by Native Americans near Fort Swatara, and in August, one settler and two Pennsylvania militia troops were killed near the fort. Three children were kidnapped within two miles of the fort. Native Americans also killed several settlers that were relocating from the Fort Swatara area. In August 1757, five local settlers (including two brothers) were killed by Native Americans, and a Pennsylvania militia soldier was wounded. A mother and child were also kidnapped. In April 1758, Native Americans staged another attack near Fort Swatara, in which four more settlers were killed and a woman was kidnapped.

=== Abandonment ===
By mid-1758, British forces started gaining control of the French and Indian War and Indian attacks in the Blue Mountains of Pennsylvania were subsiding. On May 11, Deputy Governor William Denny ordered the troops stationed at Fort Swatara to join British military units as they were advancing on French outposts. Fort Swatara was officially abandoned and it was never used again for military purposes.

== Memorialization ==
Today, no remnants of Fort Swatara exist, but its site is marked with two boulders and a Pennsylvania Historical Marker.

=== Fort Swatara's boulder markers ===
In July 1932, the Lebanon County Historical Society dedicated two boulders with copper plates to designate the location of Fort Swatara. The smaller boulder is located in a field near where the fort actually stood. The larger boulder was placed along the roadside near the site of the fort. The inscription on the larger boulder's plate reads:

"Fort Swatara of the French and Indian War. Erected in the fall of 1755. It stood 500 feet south of this spot, directly north of the run of water flowing east and west. Commanded by Capt. Frederick Smith, of Chester County, of the First Battalion of the Pennsylvania Provincial Regiment, Lieut. Colonel Conrad Weiser commanding. Finally abandoned in 1758, Capt.-Lieut. Samuel Allen in command. It consisted of a block house pierced for musketry fire and surrounded by a stockade. This boulder tablet placed by the Lebanon County Historical Society. Capt. H.M.M. Richards, President."

=== Pennsylvania historical marker ===
On July 14, 1999, a roadside Pennsylvania historical marker for Fort Swatara was dedicated and placed about one mile north of Lickdale along Pennsylvania Route 72, by the Pennsylvania Historical and Museum Commission. It reads:

"Fort Swatara – Originally built by Peter Hedrick, 1755. The stockaded blockhouse was improved in early 1756 by Capt. Frederick Smith to guard Swatara Gap and protect the frontier settlements. Site is on Fort Swatara Drive about a half a mile from this intersection."
