= Fort Franklin (Schuylkill County, Pennsylvania) =

18th century fort in colonial Pennsylvania

- Schuylkill County, Pennsylvania (near Snyders, Pennsylvania)

Site information
- Type: Military fort

Location
- Location of Fort Franklin in Pennsylvania
- Coordinates: 40°42′51″N 75°50′31″W

Site history
- Built: 1756
- In use: 1756–1757
- Battles/wars: French and Indian War

Garrison information
- Past commanders: Captain Charles Foulk; Captain Jeremiah Trexler; Lieutenant Levi Trump; Lieutenant Andreas Engel
- Garrison: 30-63 men plus officers

Pennsylvania Historical Marker
- Designated: 1955

Fort Franklin was a stockaded fort constructed at the order of Benjamin Franklin in 1756, in response to a series of raids by Native American war parties on Pennsylvania settlements in late 1755, in particular the Great Cove massacre and the Gnadenhütten massacre. The fort was intended to provide protection for settlers' families during the French and Indian War, however the fort was poorly built, located in a sparsely populated area, and stood in a vulnerable position to the north of the Blue Mountain Ridge in Pennsylvania. Located halfway between Fort Allen and Fort Lebanon, it was one in a chain of defensive posts running from the New Jersey border, southwest to the Maryland border, when attacks on settlements were frequent at the beginning of the French and Indian War. The fort never saw military action and was abandoned in late 1757.

== History ==
=== Background ===
At the beginning of the French and Indian War, Braddock's defeat at the Battle of the Monongahela left Pennsylvania without a professional military force. Lenape chiefs Shingas and Captain Jacobs launched dozens of Shawnee and Delaware raids against British colonial settlements, killing and capturing hundreds of colonists and destroying settlements across western and central Pennsylvania. In late 1755, Colonel John Armstrong wrote to Governor Robert Hunter Morris: "I am of the opinion that no other means of defense than a chain of blockhouses along or near the south side of the Kittatinny Mountains from the Susquehanna to the temporary line, can secure the lives and property of the inhabitants of this country."

In December 1755, a series of attacks on people in the area east of what is now Stroudsburg, Pennsylvania had terrified the population, who then demanded military protection from the Pennsylvania government. On 10 December, a war party of about 200 Native American warriors attacked the Hoeth family farm and killed Frederick Hoeth, his wife, and seven of their eight children. The next day, warriors set fire to Daniel Brodhead's Plantation, and attacked and burned farms belonging to the Culvers, the McMichaels, and the Hartmanns. The Moravian mission at Dansbury was also destroyed. A number of settlers died when they were trapped inside burning buildings. Over 300 people fled to Bethlehem and Easton. In an account of the attacks from the Union Iron Works in Jersey, dated 20 December, 78 people are listed killed and about 45 buildings destroyed. On 25 December, the Provincial Commissioners reported that "The Country all above this Town, for 50 Miles, is mostly evacuated and ruined, excepting only the Neighbourhood of the Dupuy's, five Families, which stand their Ground."

In response to these attacks, which occurred within a month of the Great Cove massacre and the Gnadenhütten massacre, the Pennsylvania provincial government decided to construct a chain of forts across the western frontier, running from the New Jersey border, southwest to the Maryland border. Fort Hamilton in Stroudsburg and Fort Depuy near Smithfield Township were built in December and Fort Norris, Fort Allen and Fort Franklin were built in early 1756.

=== Construction and name ===
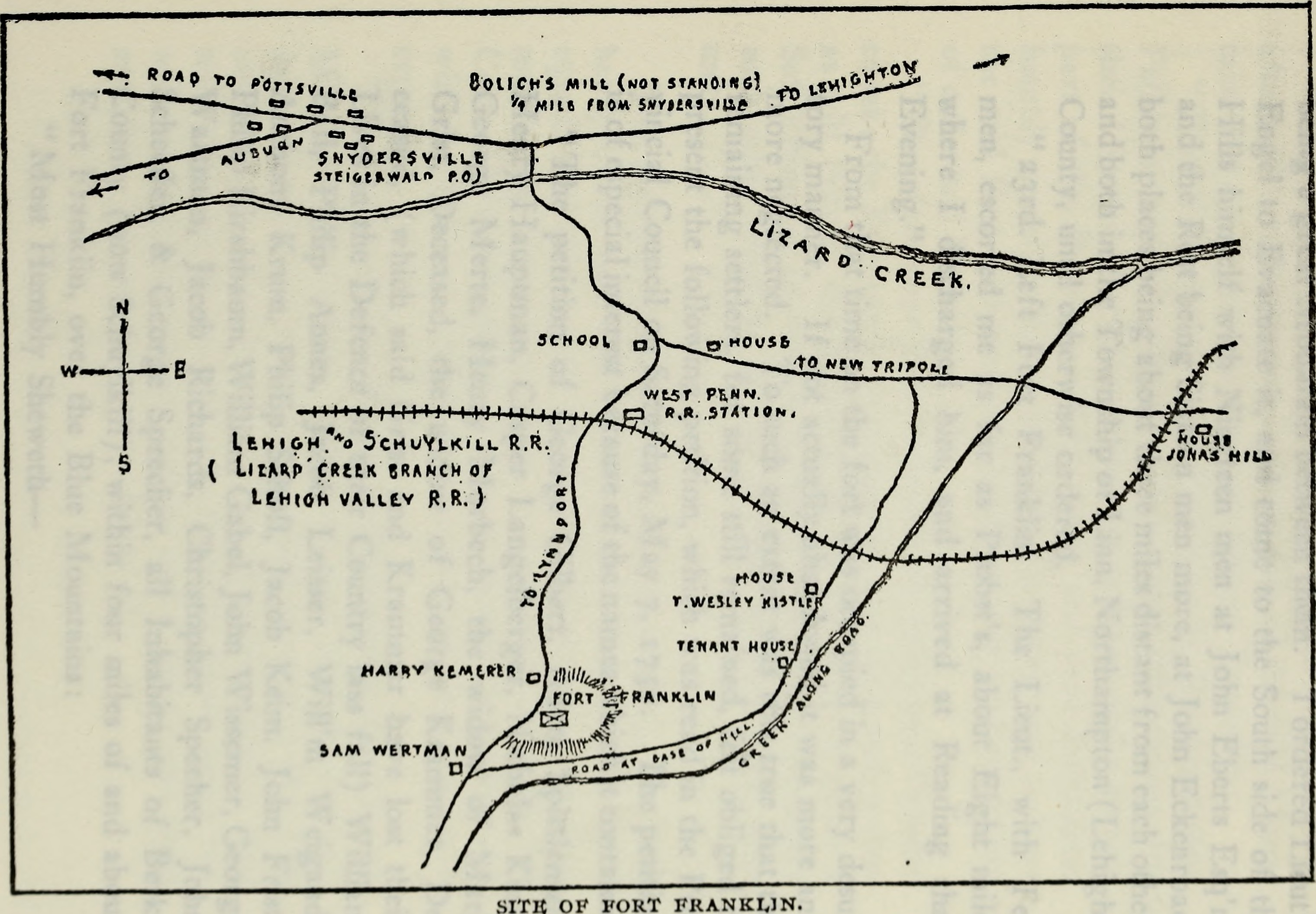
Map showing the location of Fort Franklin, southeast of Snydersville (present-day Snyders, Pennsylvania).

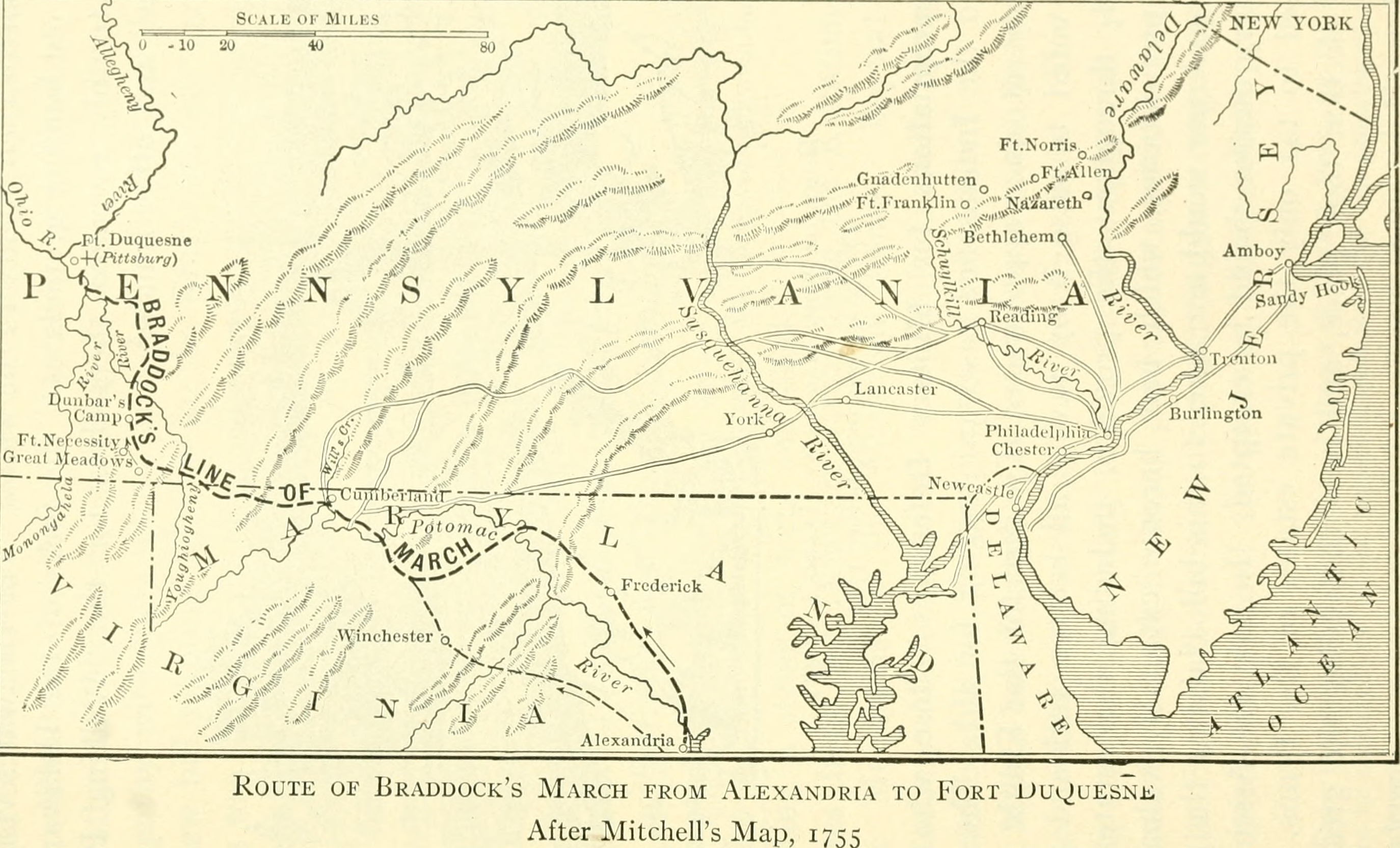
Map showing the location of Fort Franklin, upper right quadrant, south of Gnadenhütten.

Benjamin Franklin was charged with establishing a line of defense that would protect Pennsylvania settlements from attacks by French-allied Native Americans. He began by constructing Fort Allen near Bethlehem, Pennsylvania. When the fort was nearly complete in late January, 1756, Franklin sent Captain Charles Foulk to build a fort between Fort Allen and "Schuylkill Fort," (Fort Lebanon), which had been built the previous December. Foulk chose a site near a region referred to by the local German colonists as "Allemangel," loosely translated as "lacking all," or "desolation," because of the arid terrain. It was situated on a hill, near a creek, with a clear view of the surrounding countryside. Construction was largely completed by late February. As of 23 February, the fort's garrison numbered 63 men, although this was eventually reduced to 35 men plus officers.

The quality of the construction was poor, and on 3 June 1756, Major William Parsons submitted a report to Franklin on the condition of the fort, stating:

"This Fort is not so commodiously built as the others are; the Buildings within and adjoining to it are rather cumbersome than convenient; the Pallisado's of the Fort in many places stand so far from one another, that [it] is as safe for an Enemy without to fire into, as it is for the Garrison to fire out of it. And in some places I am persuaded I could have thrown down the Palisadoes with my Hands without the help of any Tool. The Houses, being 3 in all, are so large they require a great Number of Boards to make them Tolerable in Winter, and they are so high, that they require a great Quantity of Stone to the Chymneys."

The fort was named in honor of Franklin, although it was occasionally still referred to as "the fort at Allemangel." In June, Major Parsons wrote to Franklin: "Some People have grac'd the Fort at Allemengel with your Name, and I don't blame them for it; but I am sure it will not grace your Name, till it is put in a much better Condition than it is at present."

Commissary General James Young visited the fort on 21 June 1756, writing that "This Fort stands ab't a mile from the North Mountain; only two Plantations near it. This Fort is a square ab't 40 foot, very ill staccaded, with 2 Logg houses at Opposite Corners for Bastions, all very unfit for Defence; the Staccades are very open in many Places." He also mentions that there were "very few Plantations on this Road, most of them Deserted, and the houses burnt down." The local settlers took refuge in the fort every night.

=== Command ===
Once construction was completed, newly commissioned Captain Jeremiah Trexler took command of the fort with a garrison of 53 men. However, many of his troops were militia enlisted for only a short time, therefore in April 1756, Colonel William Clapham assigned Lieutenant Levi Trump and thirty soldiers to take charge of the fort. In May, Lieutenant Andreas Engel was transferred from Fort Henry to replace Trump.

=== Abandonment, 1757 ===
By November 1756, the colonial forces were stretched thin, and Colonel Conrad Weiser began looking for ways to consolidate his troops and reduce expenses. He visited Fort Franklin and decided that it should be abandoned, writing on 24 November: "I saw that the Fort was not Teanable, and the House not finished for the Soldiers, and that it could not be of any Service to the Inhabitant Part, there being a great Mountain between them. I ordered Lieut'n Engel to Evacuate it."

Although most of the garrison was reassigned to other forts, some men evidently remained at the fort until the following spring, when on 17 May twenty-two local settlers submitted a petition to Lieutenant-Governor William Denny, stating:

"Your Petitioners are informed that Fort Franklin aforesaid is to be removed to...Albany Township; That if in Case the said Fort is to be Removed your Petitioners will be Obliged to Desert their Plantations, for their Lives and Estates will then lye at Stake, and a greater part of this Province will lye waste and your Petitioners humbly conceives that it would be the Safest way, to have the said Fort continued & rebuilt, as it is very much out of order and Repair. Therefore your Petitioners humbly prays your Honour to take the Premises in Consideration and Issue such orders as will Prevent the Removal of the said Fort & order a Suffi't Number of Men in it, and to grant your Petitioners such other relief as to you in your wisdom shall seem Mete."

In response to this petition, Fort Franklin was evidently repaired, reprovisioned, and a new garrison assigned, until November 1757, when it was again abandoned, as hostilities with Native Americans were less frequent. The garrison was withdrawn to Everett's Fort.

== Archaeological investigations ==
In 1984, archaeologists conducted a systematic survey and test excavation project to locate the site of Fort Franklin. An area measuring 200 feet by 300 feet was investigated, but neither the fort nor any artifacts relating to the fort were found. In 1985, a magnetometry survey of the area was completed, and although some anomalies were identified in the ground, they were not considered to indicate the fort's site or other relevant structures.

== Memorialization ==
A historical marker was erected in 1955 by the Pennsylvania Historical and Museum Commission, in Andreas, Pennsylvania, on Pennsylvania Route 309 (West Penn Pike).

As of 1862, the fort's well was still in use.
