= Fort Norris =

18th century fort in colonial Pennsylvania

- Monroe County, Pennsylvania (near Kresgeville, Pennsylvania)

Site information
- Type: Military fort

Location
- Location of Fort Norris in Pennsylvania
- Coordinates: 40°53′49″N 75°30′11″W

Site history
- Built: 1756
- In use: 1756–1758
- Battles/wars: French and Indian War

Garrison information
- Past commanders: Captain Jacob Orndt; Captain George Reynolds; Ensign Jacob Schneider; Lieutenant Andreas Engel
- Garrison: 30-50 men plus officers

Pennsylvania Historical Marker
- Designated: 1945

Fort Norris was a stockaded fort built at the orders of Benjamin Franklin in early 1756 in what is now Monroe County, Pennsylvania, following a series of attacks on local communities by Native Americans in December 1755. Construction was initiated in late January, at the same time that neighboring forts Allen, Hamilton, and Franklin were being built. The fort was named for Isaac Norris, speaker of the Pennsylvania Provincial Assembly, who was a member of the planning committee charged with designing defenses in preparation for the French and Indian War. Located about fifteen miles east of Fort Allen, it was one in a chain of defensive posts running from the New Jersey border, southwest to the Maryland border, when attacks on settlements were frequent at the beginning of the French and Indian War. The fort never saw military action and was abandoned in late 1758.

== Background ==
At the beginning of the French and Indian War, Braddock's defeat at the Battle of the Monongahela left Pennsylvania without a professional military force. Lenape chiefs Shingas and Captain Jacobs launched dozens of Shawnee and Delaware raids against British colonial settlements, killing and capturing hundreds of colonists and destroying settlements across western and central Pennsylvania. In late 1755, Colonel John Armstrong wrote to Governor Robert Hunter Morris: "I am of the opinion that no other means of defense than a chain of blockhouses along or near the south side of the Kittatinny Mountains from the Susquehanna to the temporary line, can secure the lives and property of the inhabitants of this country."

In December 1755, a series of attacks on people in the area east of what is now Stroudsburg had terrified the population, who then demanded that the Pennsylvania government provide military protection. On 10 December, a war party of about 200 Native American warriors attacked the Hoeth family farm and killed Frederick Hoeth, his wife, and seven of their eight children. The next day, warriors set fire to Daniel Brodhead's Plantation, and attacked and burned farms belonging to the Culvers, the McMichaels, and the Hartmanns. The Moravian mission at Dansbury was also destroyed. A number of settlers died when they were trapped inside burning buildings. Over 300 people fled to Bethlehem and Easton.

In response to these attacks, which occurred within a month of the Great Cove massacre and the Gnadenhütten massacre, the Pennsylvania provincial government decided to construct a chain of forts across the western frontier, running from the New Jersey border, southwest to the Maryland border. Fort Hamilton in Stroudsburg and Fort Dupuy near Smithfield Township were built in December and Fort Norris, Fort Allen and Fort Franklin were built in early 1756.

== History ==
=== Construction ===
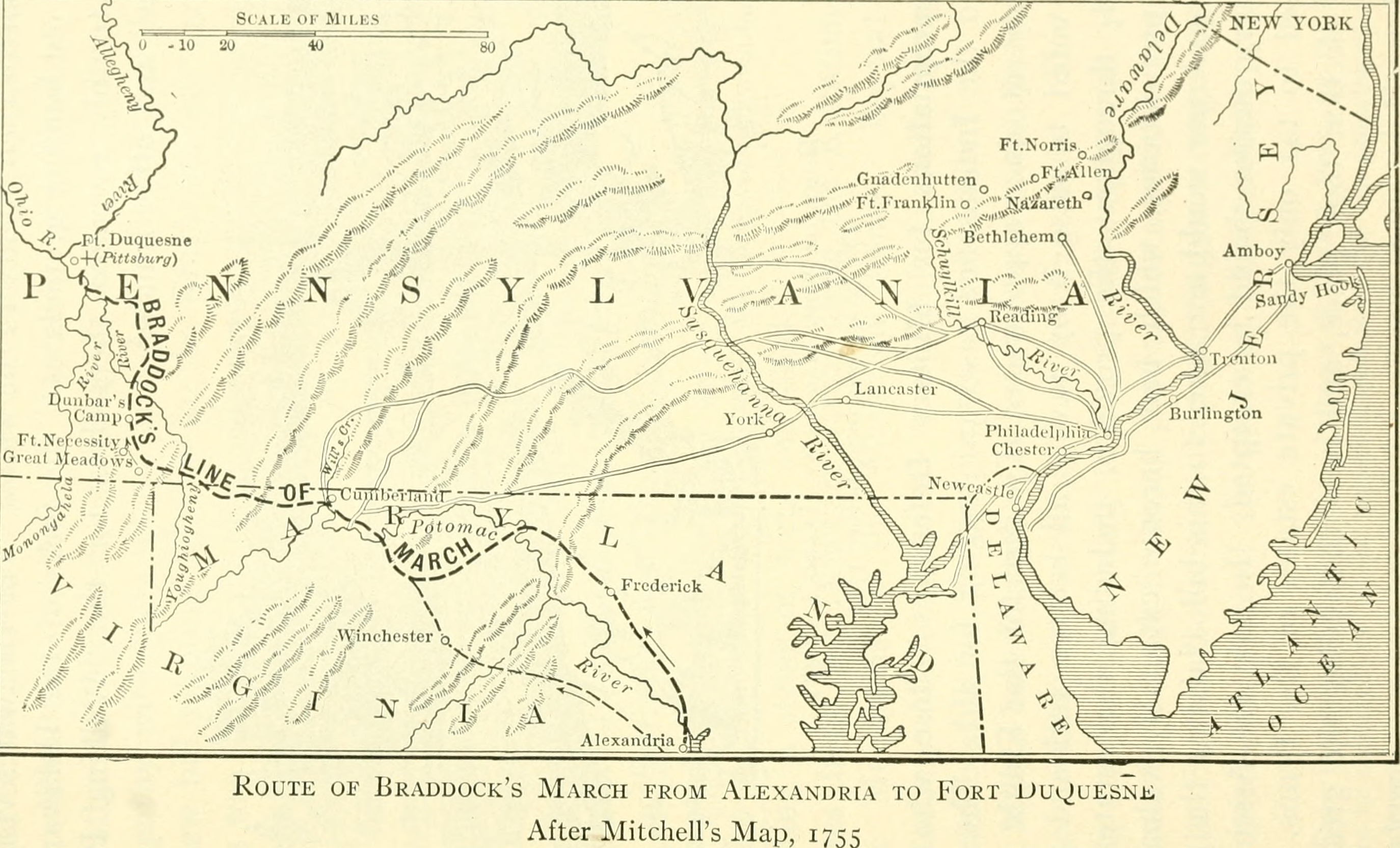
Map showing the location of Fort Norris, upper right quadrant, northeast of Fort Allen.

In January 1756, Franklin sent Captain Jacob Orndt to assist Captain Adam Trump and Captain George Aston (Ashton) in building Fort Norris. Trump and Aston had selected a site on land owned by Johann Philip Serfas, a local farmer. Years later Samuel Preston, a surveyor, wrote that the colonial officers "took all they had for the soldiers, and sent [the Serfas family] off empty-handed to seek their fortunes. They were gone eight years, during which time all their buildings were burned as well as fences."

Construction was delayed repeatedly by lack of tools and boards, so that soldiers had to strip boards from the barns and outbuildings of local settlers, leading to numerous complaints. On 14 January 1756, Franklin wrote to Governor Morris from Bethlehem: "Trump and Aston had made but slow Progress in building the First Fort [Fort Norris], complaining for want of Tools, which it was thought the People in those Parts might have Supply'd them with...Capt. Wayne tells me that Trump expects the first Fort will be finished next week."

Captain Orndt completed construction in early February, and became the fort's commander with a garrison of 50 men.

=== Description ===
1780 map of Pennsylvania showing Fort Norris on the center right of the page.

Major William Parsons visited the fort on 11 June and wrote that "it is a well built Fort and kept very clean, Commanded by Captain Orndt, who appears to be a very good Officer. He complains for want of Boards to finish his Scaffold, etc...There is a large Hill to the Southward of the Fort from whence I imagine an Enemy might discover most that passes at the Fort."

Commissary General James Young inspected Fort Norris on 23 June 1756, and reported:

"Came to Fort Norris, found here a Serjeant Commanding 21 men, he told me the Ensign with 12 men was gone out this morning to Range the Woods towards Fort Allen, the Cap'tn was at Philadelphia since the 16th for the peoples' pay...This Fort Stands in a Valley ab't midway between the North mountain, and the Tuscorory, 6 miles from Each on the high Road towards the Minisink, it is a Square ab't 80 ft Each way with 4 half Bastions all very Completely Staccaded, and finished and very Defenceable, the Woods are Clear 400 yds Round it, on the Bastions are two Sweevel Guns mount'd, within is a good Barrack, a Guard Room, Store Room, and kitchin also a Good Well."

Historians believe that Fort Norris was located about one mile southeast of Kresgeville, Pennsylvania, just south of Pohopoco Creek, and to the north of a road passing east towards the Minisink (present-day Mountain View Drive) near its intersection with Silver Spring Boulevard. A 19th-century map shows a well and a cemetery to the east of the fort.

=== Command ===
Captain Orndt was considered to be a capable officer, and following the mutiny at Fort Allen in August 1756, Lieutenant Anthony Miller, who was held partially responsible, was transferred to Fort Norris, where he was to serve under Orndt's command. Miller, still angry over the events at Fort Allen, objected to being placed under Orndt's command, stating that "he had as good a Commission as his Capt. and he would not submit to him." On 26 August, a man who refused to serve his turn at sentry duty was supported by the men of the company. The same day, Orndt's company sent to Colonel Conrad Weiser and to Major Parsons a petition complaining about their food and pay. On 8 October, Orndt was reassigned to command Fort Allen, and Captain Reynolds and the entire Fort Allen garrison were transferred to Fort Norris, while the Fort Norris garrison was sent to Fort Allen. After conflicts with other officers, Reynolds resigned in February 1757, and was replaced temporarily by Ensign Jacob Schneider. In May 1757, Lieutenant Andreas Engels was transferred from Fort Franklin to take command of Fort Norris. The garrison at that time was still 50 men.

=== Abandonment, 1758 ===
The fort was still in use as of 28 February 1758, with a reduced garrison, when Major James Burd visited, writing that he "Arrived at Lieu't Ingle's at 4 P.M., ordered a Review Immediately, & found here Lieu't Ingle and 30 good men in a very good Stockade, which he is just finishing, 15 miles from Fort Allen." Burd noted that Engels was completing some repairs to the fort, suggesting that it was expected to remain in use.

On 27 September, Deputy Governor William Denny ordered Colonel Weiser to abandon Fort Norris and to transfer its garrison to the blockhouse at Wind Gap.

== Memorialization ==
A stone monument, placed in 1945 by the Monroe County Historical Association, is located east of Kresgeville, at the intersection of US Route 209 and Pennsylvania Route 534. The inscription reads:

"Erected 1756 one mile southeast across Pohopoco Creek, one of a line of frontier forts built under the direction of James Hamilton and Benjamin Franklin. Commanded successively by Captain Jacob Orndt, "an excellent officer", Capt. Reynolds and Lieut. Engell, located strategically for guarding the settlers north of the Blue Mountains during the French and Indian War."
