= Daniel Brodhead (disambiguation) =

Daniel Brodhead (1736–1809) was an American military and political leader.

Daniel Brodhead may also refer to:

- Captain Daniel Brodhead I (1631–1667) who married Anne Tye (1640–1714) migrated from England to America
- Captain Daniel Brodhead II (1693–1755), justice of the peace, first European to settle Stroudsburg, Pennsylvania. He married Hester Wyngart
