= Fort Hyndshaw =

18th century fort in colonial Pennsylvania

- Route 209 in Middle Smithfield Township; Near East Stroudsburg, Pennsylvania in US

Site information
- Type: Fort
- Owner: State of Pennsylvania
- Open to the public: Yes
- Condition: Destroyed by nature

Location
- Location of the fort in northeast Pennsylvania
- Coordinates: 41°05′10.3″N 75°00′27.2″W
- Height: 70 feet (21 m) (at time of occupation)

Site history
- Built: 1756
- In use: 1758
- Fate: Abandoned
- Events: French and Indian War

Garrison information
- Past commanders: Captain James Van Etten

Pennsylvania Historical Marker
- Designated: January 7, 1949

Fort Hyndshaw (sometimes referred to in contemporary records as Hyndshaw's Fort, or the Fort at Hyndshaw's) was a fort in Middle Smithfield Township, Monroe County, Pennsylvania, built in 1756. It was the northernmost of a line of Pennsylvania defenses erected during the French and Indian War. The fort was abandoned by its militia garrison in July 1757, but was still used by local settlers as a refuge from Native American attacks, until June 1758 when it was captured by Native American warriors and its inhabitants were taken prisoner.

== The need for fortifications ==
At the beginning of the French and Indian War, Braddock's defeat at the Battle of the Monongahela left Pennsylvania without a professional military force. Lenape chiefs Shingas and Captain Jacobs launched dozens of Shawnee and Delaware raids against British colonial settlements, killing and capturing hundreds of colonists and destroying settlements across western and central Pennsylvania. In late 1755, Colonel John Armstrong wrote to Governor Robert Hunter Morris: "I am of the opinion that no other means of defense than a chain of blockhouses along or near the south side of the Kittatinny Mountains from the Susquehanna to the temporary line, can secure the lives and property of the inhabitants of this country."

In December 1755, a series of attacks on people in the area east of what is now Stroudsburg had terrified the population, who then demanded that the Pennsylvania government provide military protection. On 10 December, a war party of about 200 Native American warriors attacked the Hoeth family farm and killed Frederick Hoeth, his wife, and seven of their eight children. The next day, warriors set fire to Daniel Brodhead's Plantation, and attacked and burned farms belonging to the Culvers, the McMichaels, and the Hartmanns. The Moravian mission at Dansbury was also destroyed. A number of settlers died when they were trapped inside burning buildings. Over 300 people fled to Bethlehem and Easton. In an account of the attacks from the Union Iron Works in Jersey, dated 20 December, 78 people are listed killed and about 45 buildings destroyed. On 25 December, the Provincial Commissioners reported that "The Country all above this Town, for 50 Miles, is mostly evacuated and ruined, excepting only the Neighbourhood of the Dupuy's, five Families, which stand their Ground."

In response to these attacks, the Pennsylvania Legislature placed Benjamin Franklin and James Hamilton in charge to erect a chain of forts along the Blue Mountain in the Minisink region. Franklin, via a letter dated January 12, 1756 to Captain James Van Etten, ordered him to "proceed immediately to raise a Company of Foot, consisting of 30 able Men, including two Serjeants, with which you are to protect the Inhabitants of Upper Smithfield assisting them while they thresh out and secure their Corn, and scouting from time to time as you judge necessary on the Outside of the Settlements." Franklin wrote to Governor Morris that "I have also allow'd 30 Men to secure the Township of Upper Smithfield, and commission'd Van Etten and Hinshaw as Captain and Lieutenant."

== History ==
=== Origin of the name ===
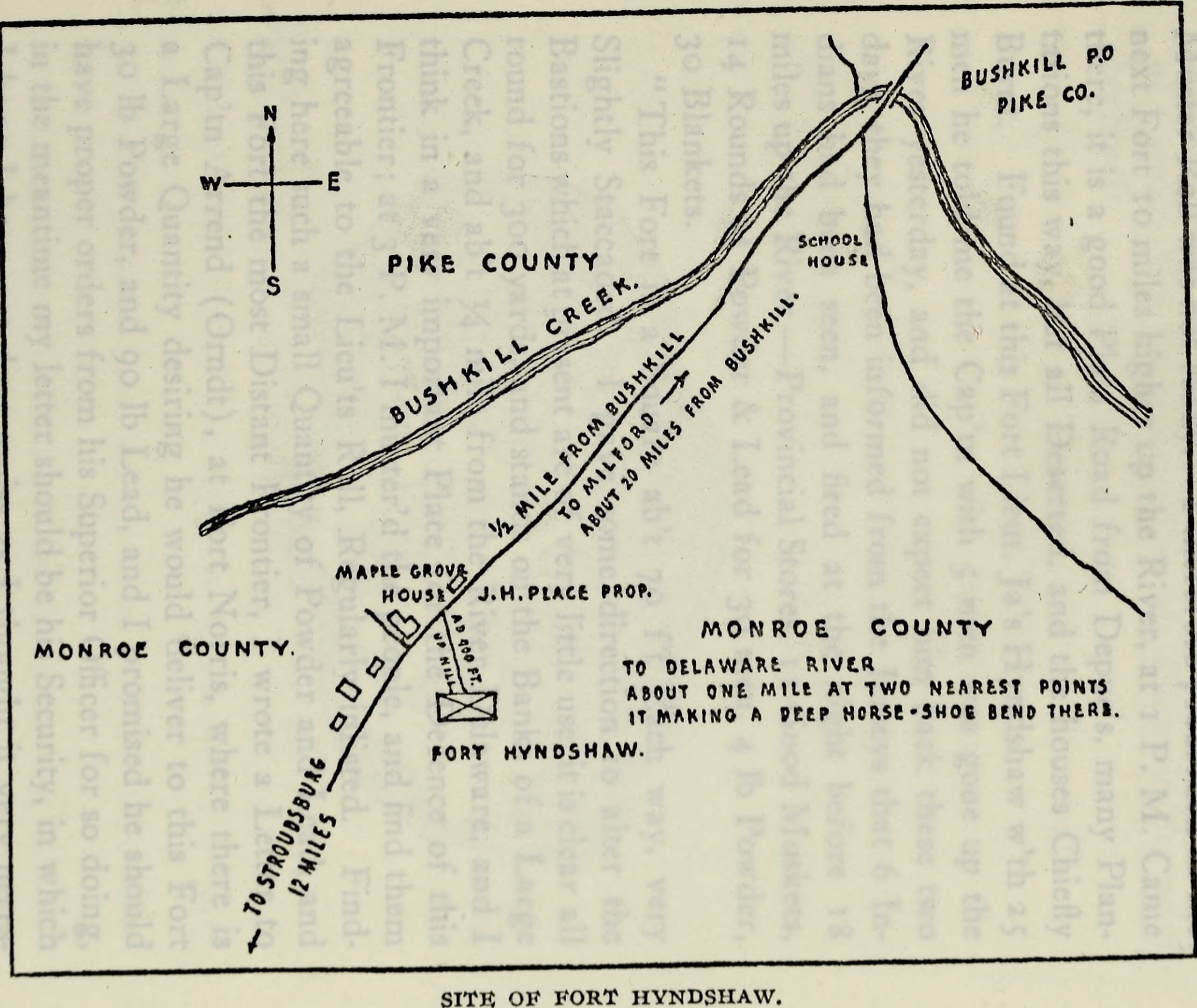
Map showing the location of Fort Hyndshaw in Monroe County.

The fort was named after Lieutenant James Hyndshaw (1720-1770), who was born in Ulster County, New York and was married to Maria Dupui/DePuy, a niece of Nicholas DePuy, one of the earliest European settlers from Esopus, New York, in Northampton County (present-day Monroe County), whose home became Fort Depuy during the French and Indian War, around the same time as Fort Hyndshaw was built. Hyndshaw was second in command to Van Etten.

=== Construction ===
Construction was initiated in January, 1756 and included a 70-foot square stockade built around Hyndshaw's home. The first garrison numbered only eight men, so it is likely that local settlers assisted in building the fort. On 23 January, Captain Van Etten's home was attacked and his "Barn, Barracks, and all his Wheat are likewise burnt, and three of his best Horses, with Gears, carried off by the Enemy." Van Etten and his men pursued the attackers, killing two of them and wounding several more. One of the dead was erroneously reported to have been the Lenape chief Captain Jacobs.

Construction was evidently completed by early February, when Franklin reported that Captain Van Etten, Lieutenant Hyndshaw, and thirty men occupied the fort.

Commissary General James Young visited the fort on 24 June 1756, writing "This Fort is a Square ab't 70 f't Each way, very Slightly Staccaded. I gave some direction to alter the Bastions which at present are of very little use, it is clear all round for 300 yards, and stand on the Banks of a Large Creek, and ab't a quarter mile from the River Delaware, and I think in a very important Place for the Defence of this Frontier."

=== Abandonment, 1757 ===
In March 1757, Captain Van Etten was transferred to take command of Fort Hamilton, and Lieutenant Hyndshaw was sent with 25 men to Reading. As the garrison was now reduced to about half a dozen men, Van Etten insisted that local settlers share sentry duty at night, as there had been a few attacks in the area.

On 14 June, Captain Van Etten was ordered by Deputy Governor William Denny to evacuate Fort Hyndshaw and the garrison was sent to Fort Hamilton on 19 June. In July, Lieutenant Hyndshaw returned to the fort with 10 men, probably to remove the fort's remaining stores before it was abandoned.

=== Fort Hyndshaw Massacre ===
Local settlers apparently used the fort as a refuge from attacks during the following year, until it was captured in 1758. On 15 June, Samuel Dupui wrote:

"...this morning we heared the Disagreeable news of a Fort being taken at the upper end of the minisinks by a party of Indians supposed to be 40 in number, the whitemen it's said belonging to that Garrison were Farmers and were out in their plantations when the Indians fired on them and killed them, whereupon the Indians marched up to the Fort and took all the women and Children Captive and Carryed them away."

Archaeologist Danny Younger has proposed that the Native American warriors who captured the fort killed most or all of their prisoners, who may have been the families of Moravian missionaries. The nearby Nazareth Moravian Cemetery contains 46 unmarked graves, where the victims of the massacre may be buried.

== Memorialization ==
A historical marker was placed in East Stroudsburg by the Pennsylvania Historical and Museum Commission in 1949. In 2003, a replacement historical marker was erected in the same location.
