= Northampton massacre =

18th-century massacre in colonial Pennsylvania

- Part of the French and Indian War
- Northampton County in Pennsylvania, the site of the massacre
- Location: 40°45′0″N 75°18′36″W; Northampton County, Pennsylvania
- Date: 10 and 11 December 1755
- Attack type: Mass murder
- Deaths: 78-89 killed
- Victim: European settlers
- Assailant: Lenape warriors from Minisink

The Northampton massacre was a series of attacks on white settlers in Northampton County, Pennsylvania in December 1755. These attacks terrified the population, who then demanded military protection from the colonial government of Pennsylvania. On 10 and 11 December, a party of Native American warriors (estimates range from 200 to only 5) attacked the Hoeth family farm and killed Frederick Hoeth and his wife, and took three of their children captive. They also set fire to Daniel Brodhead's Plantation, and attacked and burned about a dozen farms in the area. The Moravian mission at Dansbury was also destroyed.

In one account of the attacks, 78 people were listed killed and about 45 buildings destroyed. Other sources reported up to 89 dead. These attacks led the provincial government to put Benjamin Franklin in charge of designing a defensive chain of stockade forts and blockhouses to protect European settlements in central and eastern Pennsylvania. This defensive line offered some protection for settlers during the French and Indian War.

== Background ==
Relations between European settlers and the Lenape Indians, and with the Minisink, a phratry of the Lenape, had deteriorated following the 1737 Walking Purchase, in which the government of the Province of Pennsylvania brokered an agreement which allowed them to take possession of lands along the northern Delaware River that the Lenape considered to be theirs. There is some evidence that this was a deliberate deception on the part of the Pennsylvania government. Most of the Lenape were forced to relocate into western Pennsylvania.

On 24 November 1755, tensions rose in Northampton County after settlers in the neighboring Province of New Jersey detained a group of 15 Minisink Indians, including three men and a dozen women and children, and brought them to the jail at Easton. The reasons for detaining them are unclear, but the people of Easton were concerned that this act would provoke violence from the Indians, and the next day the prisoners were transferred to another prison in New Jersey.

== Attacks ==
On 11 December 1755, the Moravian bishop August Gottlieb Spangenberg wrote to Timothy Horsfield, a justice of the peace from Bethlehem, who forwarded his letters to Governor Robert Hunter Morris. Spangenberg described an assault on several farms in the area, by a band of 200 Native American warriors, who had killed a number of settlers and destroyed about a dozen farms. A number of settlers died when they were trapped inside burning buildings. Over 300 people fled to Bethlehem and Easton.

On 25 December, the Pennsylvania Gazette published a letter from the Pennsylvania Commissioners, describing some of the attacks and reporting a plan to build forts and blockhouses in the area to protect the populace:

"The Country all above this Town, for 50 Miles, is mostly evacuated and ruined, excepting only the Neighbourhood of the Dupuy’s, five Families, which stand their Ground. The People are chiefly fled into the Jerseys...The Enemy made but few Prisoners, murdering almost all that fell into their Hands, of all Ages and both Sexes: All Business is at an End, and the few remaining starving Inhabitants in this Town, are quite dejected and dispirited. Captains Aston and Trump march up to Dupuy's this Day, and are to build two Block Houses for the Defence of the Country between that Settlement and Gnadenhütten, which, when finished, the Inhabitants that are fled say they will return."

In an account of the attacks from the Union Iron Works in Jersey, dated 20 December, 78 people are listed killed and about 45 buildings destroyed. Other sources report as many as 89 dead.

=== The Hoeth family ===
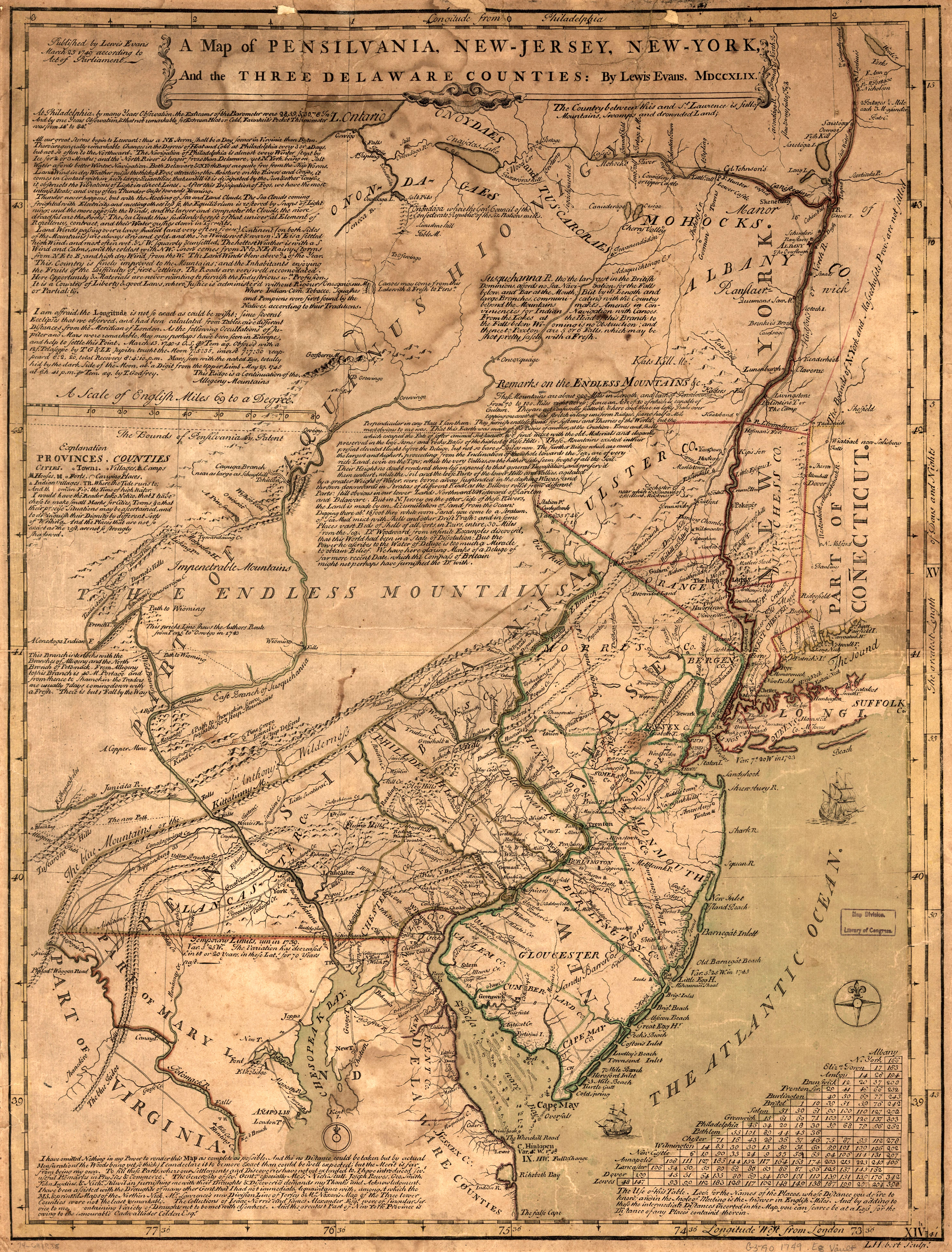
1749 map of the Province of Pennsylvania and New Jersey, showing where the Brodhead Plantation ("Broadheads") was located, near the New Jersey border, just below the center of the page. Beside it is the Depue Plantation, which later became the site of Fort Depuy.

1770 map of the Province of Pennsylvania showing Broadhead Creek, where the Brodhead plantation was located, near the New Jersey border, on the center right of the page. Heads Creek, where the Hoeth homestead was located, is just beneath Fort Allen.

The Hoeth farm on Pohopoco Creek (then known as Heads [Hoeth's] Creek) was attacked and only two settlers survived. Michael Hoeth (referred to in some documents as Michael Hute) gave a deposition on 12 December to Judge William Parsons, in which he described the attack on the Hoeth farm:

"The 12th Day of December, 1755, Personally appeared before me, William Parsons, one of his Majesty's Justices of the Peace for the County of Northampton, Michael Hute, aged about 21 Years, who being duly sworn on the Holy Evangelists of Almighty God did depose and declare that last Wednesday, about 6 of the Clock, Afternoon, a Company of Indians, about 5 in number, attacked the House of Frederick Hoeth, about 12 miles Eastward from Gnadenhütten, on Pocho-Pocho Creek. That the family being at Supper, the Indians shot into the House and wounded a woman; at the next shot they killed Frederick Hoeth himself, and shot several times more, whereupon all ran out of the house that could. The Indians immediately set fire to the House, Mill and Stables. Hoeth's wife ran into the Bakehouse, which was also set on fire. The poor woman ran out thro' the Flames, and being very much burnt she ran into the water and there dyed. The Indians cut her belly open, and used her otherwise inhumanely. They killed and Scalped a Daughter, and he [Hute] thinks that three other Children who were of the Family were burnt. Three of Hoeth's Daughters are missing with another Woman, who are supposed to be carried off. In the action one Indian was killed and another wounded."

On 18 December, the Pennsylvania Gazette published the deposition of George Caspar Heiss before Timothy Horsfield. Heiss, a smith, was one of two survivors of the attack on the Hoeth farm, during which Heiss's wife was killed and his house burned. He fought with the warriors, then escaped with Michael Hoeth (Hute).

Frederick Hoeth's daughter Mariana was captured with two of her sisters and taken to Tioga, Pennsylvania. She escaped in 1760 and wrote an account of the attack:

"While gathered around the table for our evening meal, we heard some shots close at hand. My father expressed surprise that the savages should be in our neighborhood, and went to the front door to investigate. In an instant several Indians rushed upon him and shot him down. We saw him fall, and without a moment’s delay fled precipitately through the back door. Not far away there was a small stream, and just as my mother was about to enter the water, she fell dead on the brink, pierced by a bullet. My youngest sister too was killed on the spot. As for me and my two other sisters, we were seized by the monsters and dragged away."

=== Dansbury Mission ===
The Dansbury Moravian Mission was established on land donated by Daniel Brodhead II, after he and his wife converted to the Moravian faith. In 1744, Moravian missionary James Burnside built a small log cabin and named it the Dansbury Mission (after "Dan" Brodhead). In 1753, Brodhead built a parsonage and a chapel, with a cemetery nearby, which can still be seen today. A school was opened in late 1753. Brodhead died in June 1755 and his oldest son Daniel Brodhead III took over the Brodhead plantation and the family home, known as Dansbury Manor. In the massacre of December 11, the mission was burned and a few surviving residents took shelter with the Brodhead family.

=== The Brodhead plantation ===
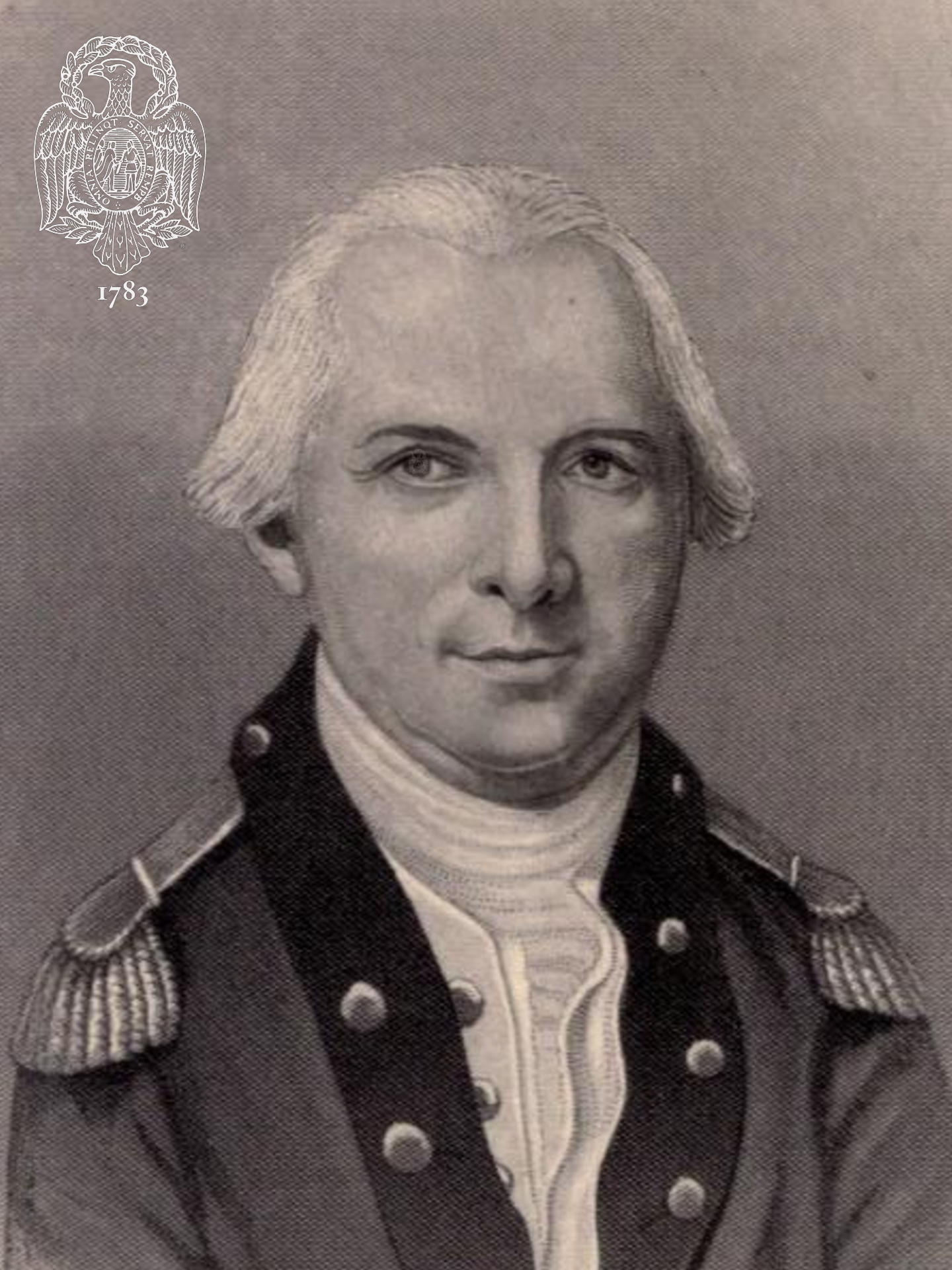
1880 portrait of Daniel Brodhead as a Continental Army officer

The plantation of Daniel Brodhead in present-day East Stroudsburg, Pennsylvania was attacked and a barn and barracks burned, but Brodhead and his family succeeded in fighting off the Indians. Daniel Brodhead and his four brothers, Charles, Garret, John and Luke, along with his 12-year-old sister, Ann, fired at the attackers through windows of the Dansbury Manor.

In a deposition on 12 December, several settlers testified that "they saw the Barn of the Said Broadhead's on fire about nine of the Clock in the morning, which continued Burning till they left the House, being about 4 [in the] afternoon, and that they heard shooting and crying at Broadhead's House almost the whole Day, and that when they left McMichael's House the Dwelling House of said Broadhead was yet unburnt, being, as they supposed, defended by the People within it." In a deposition published in the Gazette on 18 December, Henry Cole testified before Judge Anderson that he saw a war party of about a hundred Native American warriors attacking the Brodhead plantation, and after climbing a nearby hill, he saw several buildings, including his own home, in flames. On 25 December, James Hamilton wrote to Governor Morris: "Broadhead's [home] was stoutly defended by his sons and others, till the Indians thought fit to retire without being able to take it, or set it on fire, tho' they frequently attempted it. It is thought several of them were killed in the attacks."

== Aftermath ==
In response to these attacks, which occurred within a month of the Great Cove massacre and the Gnadenhütten massacre, the Pennsylvania provincial government decided to construct a chain of forts across the western frontier, running from the New Jersey border, southwest to the Maryland border. Fort Hamilton in Stroudsburg and Fort Depuy near Smithfield Township were built in December and Fort Norris, Fort Allen and Fort Franklin were built in early 1756. Settlers also built and manned several secondary posts, blockhouses and fortified homesteads in the area.

In June 1756, warriors attacked Brodhead's plantation again and destroyed it.

Marie Le Roy and Barbara Leininger reported that, during their captivity, before their escape on 16 March 1759, they met three sisters "from the Blue Mountains, Mary, Caroline and Catherine Hoeth." Mary (Mariana) Hoeth eventually escaped with her infant son and returned to Bethlehem. Her captivity narrative was published in The Monroe Democrat on 31 October 1896.

== Memorialization ==
A historical marker in Stroudsburg commemorates the Dansbury Moravian mission. It was erected in 1947 by the Pennsylvania Historical and Museum Commission and stands near the mission's cemetery.
