= Fort Hamilton (Pennsylvania) =

18th century fort in colonial Pennsylvania

- Monroe County, Pennsylvania (in present-day Stroudsburg, Pennsylvania)

Site information
- Type: Military fort

Location
- Location of Fort Hamilton in Pennsylvania
- Coordinates: 40°59′09″N 75°11′43″W

Site history
- Built: 1756
- In use: 1756–1758
- Battles/wars: French and Indian War

Garrison information
- Past commanders: Captain William Craig; Lieutenant Anthony Miller; Captain John Nicholaus Wetterholt; Captain Jacob Van Etten; Lieutenant James Hyndshaw
- Garrison: 16-41 men plus officers

Pennsylvania Historical Marker
- Designated: 1967

Fort Hamilton was a stockaded fort built during the French and Indian War to protect Pennsylvania settlers in the area of what is now Stroudsburg, Pennsylvania. The fort was named for James Hamilton, former Mayor of Philadelphia, and former and subsequent Deputy Governor of the Province of Pennsylvania. The fort never saw military action and was abandoned in 1757.

== History ==
=== Background ===
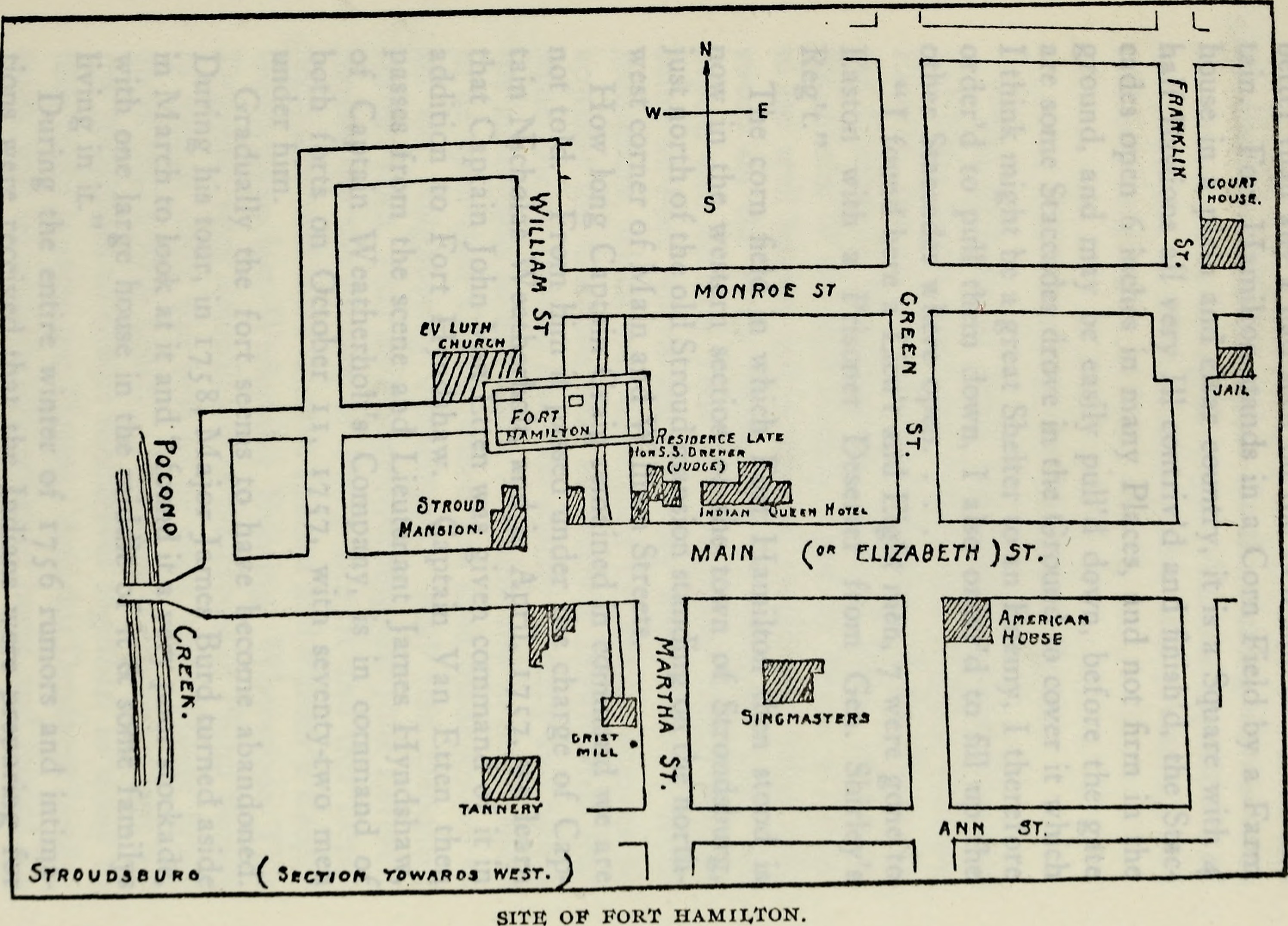
Map showing the location of Fort Hamilton, superimposed on an 1896 map of Stroudsburg, Pennsylvania.

At the beginning of the French and Indian War, Braddock's defeat at the Battle of the Monongahela left Pennsylvania without a professional military force. Lenape chiefs Shingas and Captain Jacobs launched dozens of Shawnee and Delaware raids against British colonial settlements, killing and capturing hundreds of colonists and destroying settlements across western and central Pennsylvania. In late 1755, Colonel John Armstrong wrote to Governor Robert Hunter Morris: "I am of the opinion that no other means of defense than a chain of blockhouses along or near the south side of the Kittatinny Mountains from the Susquehanna to the temporary line, can secure the lives and property of the inhabitants of this country."

In December 1755, a series of attacks on people in the area east of what is now Stroudsburg, Pennsylvania had terrified the population, who then demanded military protection from the Pennsylvania government. On 10 December, a war party of about 200 Native American warriors attacked the Hoeth family farm and killed Frederick Hoeth, his wife, and seven of their eight children. The next day, warriors set fire to Daniel Brodhead's Plantation, and attacked and burned farms belonging to the Culvers, the McMichaels, and the Hartmanns. The Moravian mission at Dansbury was also destroyed. A number of settlers died when they were trapped inside burning buildings. Over 300 people fled to Bethlehem and Easton. In an account of the attacks from the Union Iron Works in Jersey, dated 20 December, 78 people are listed killed and about 45 buildings destroyed. On 25 December, the Provincial Commissioners reported that "The Country all above this Town, for 50 Miles, is mostly evacuated and ruined, excepting only the Neighbourhood of the Dupuy's, five Families, which stand their Ground."

On 25 December, the Provincial Commissioners reported that "The Country all above this Town, for 50 Miles, is mostly evacuated and ruined, excepting only the Neighbourhood of the Dupuy's, five Families, which stand their Ground." In response to these attacks, the Pennsylvania Legislature placed Benjamin Franklin and James Hamilton in charge to erect a chain of forts along the Blue Mountain in the Minisink region.

=== Construction ===
Captain John Trump and Captain George Ashton were sent on 17 December to begin construction on Fort Depuy, Fort Norris and Fort Hamilton. No detailed descriptions exist, but Fort Hamilton was apparently a blockhouse surrounded by a stockade about 80 feet in diameter, with half-bastions at each corner. The site was near several farms, in what later became Stroudsburg. During construction, Captain Ashton annoyed local farmers by sending his men to strip boards from their barns, as there was no nearby sawmill.

The quality of the construction was imperfect, as Major William Parsons wrote after he inspected the fort on 12 June, 1756:

"Fort Hamilton...is garrison'd by Lieut. Anthony Miller with a Detachmt. of 15 Men of Capt. Orndt's Company...Lieut. Miller complains much for want of Boards to finish the Scaffolds, Floors Partitions, etc. He had sunk a Well in the Fort but for want of a Mason it is not yet wall'd up...Some of the Neighbours complain that Capt. Aston took their Boards for the Use of the Fort, but never accounted for them. John Drake says he strip'd a great Quantity of Boards from his Barn & some say that most of the Boards had from Ephraim Culbert's Mill...I was inform'd that this Fort took the most time of any of the Forts to get it in the Order it is. But by the roughness of its Work one might be induced to think it had been built in a Hurry."

Commissary General James Young visited the fort on 24 June 1756 and reported: "Fort Hamilton stands in a Corn field by a Farm house in a Plain and Clear Country, it is a Square with 4 half Bastions all very Ill Contriv'd and finish'd, the Staccades open 6 inches in many Places, and not firm in the ground, and may be easily pull'd down. Before the gate are some Staccades drove in the Ground to Cover it which I think might be a great Shelter to an Enemy. I therefore order'd to pull them down, I also order'd to fill up the other Staccades where open."

=== Command and Garrison ===
Construction was completed by early February, and Franklin sent Captain William Craig to garrison the fort with 41 men from his "company of Ulster-Scotch" infantry. Craig and his men were soon replaced by Lieutenant Anthony Miller and 15 men detached from Captain Jacob Orndt's company at Fort Norris.

Miller was replaced in July by Captain John Nicholaus Wetterholt, who reported in November that he commanded a garrison of 26 men. He also mentions that "Fort Hamilton wants Boards & it is incumbered and incommoded by some small Buildings & Fences of the neighbouring Peoples." Miller was eventually arrested for insubordination after a mutiny at Fort Allen.

In February 1757, there was a general mobilization of troops to Cumberland County to defend against an expected attack, and Captain Jacob Van Etten was transferred to Fort Hamilton with a garrison of 16 men. In June, Fort Hyndshaw was abandoned and its garrison, under the command of Lieutenant Hyndshaw, was sent to Fort Hamilton. Some men were also sent from Fort Norris after a series of Native American attacks in the area, in April and June. Van Etten and Hyndshaw were not on good terms, however, and Van Etten resigned in July, placing Hyndshaw in command.

=== Abandonment, 1757 ===
On 27 September 1757, Deputy Governor William Denny ordered Colonel Weiser to abandon Fort Hamilton and to transfer its garrison to the blockhouse at Wind Gap. Local settlers submitted a petition requesting that the fort be maintained and its garrison enlarged, but the request was ignored.

Settlers subsequently used the fort as a refuge from attacks during the following year. Major James Burd visited the fort on 2 March 1758, and wrote: "Arrived at Fort Hamilton at 2 PM, viewed it, & found it a very poor stockade with one large house in the Middle of it & some Familys living in it."

By August 1763, when Pontiac's War began, the fort had deteriorated to the point where it was no longer useful. Captain Jacob Stroud was advised to build a stockade around his homestead, which then became Fort Penn.

== Memorialization ==
Two historical markers for Fort Hamilton can be found near the fort's original site: A brass plaque at 901 Main Street was placed there in 1930 by the Pennsylvania Historic Commission and The Monroe County Historical Society. A marker was placed in 1967 by the Pennsylvania Historical and Museum Commission at the intersection of Main Street (Business U.S. 209) and 9th Street in Stroudsburg.
