= Daniel Brodhead I =

- Born: Daniel Brodhead c. 1631; West Riding of Yorkshire, England
- Died: July 14, 1667 (aged 35–36); Esopus, New York, English America
- Spouse: Anne Tye (m. 1660)
- Children: 5
- Relatives: Daniel Brodhead II (grandson)

Daniel Brodhead I (c. 1631 – July 14, 1667) of Yorkshire, England served as a royalist and Captain of Grenadiers of the army of Charles II of England.

== Biography ==
He was born c. 1631 in Yorkshire, England. Under an expedition led by Colonel Richard Nichols in 1664, Brodhead played a role in the capture of New Netherland. He settled in Marbletown, New York, in 1665. He died on July 14, 1667, in Esopus, New York.

== Legacy ==
His grandson Daniel Brodhead II settled the area of Stroudsburg, Pennsylvania, and his great-grandson Daniel Brodhead was a noted leader during the American Revolutionary War.
