= Gnadenhütten massacre (Pennsylvania) =

Attack by Native Americans on a Pennsylvania Moravian settlement in 1755

- Part of the French and Indian War
- Location of Gnadenhütten settlement in the Province of Pennsylvania, 1755
- Location: 40°49′55″N 75°42′53″W; Gnadenhütten (present day Lehighton, Pennsylvania
- Date: 24 November 1755
- Attack type: Mass murder
- Deaths: 11 killed
- Victim: Moravian missionaries
- Assailant: Shawnee or possibly Munsee warriors

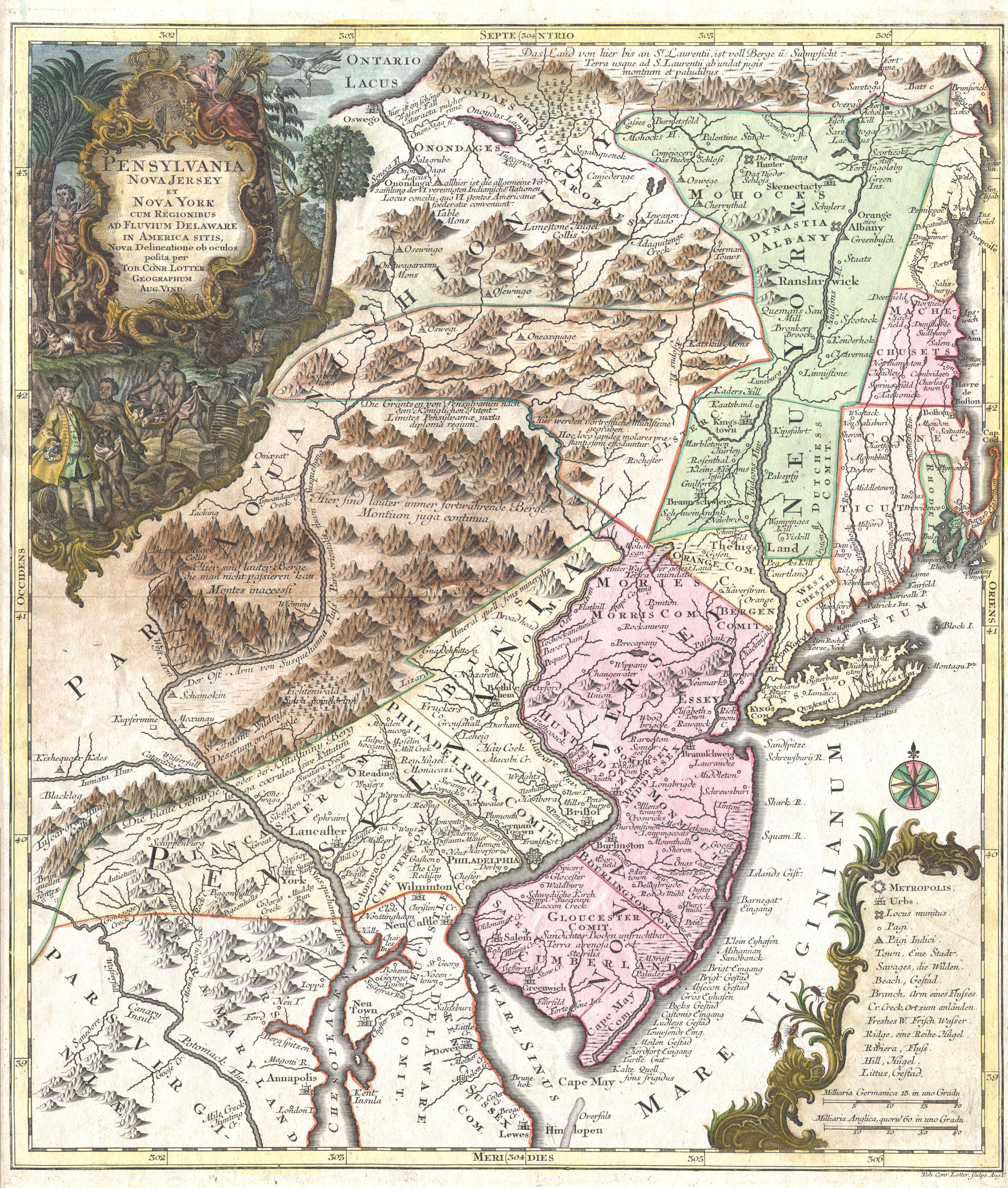
Tobias Conrad Lotter's 1756 map of Eastern Pennsylvania and New Jersey depicting Gnadenhütten, left of the map's center.

The Gnadenhütten massacre was an attack during the French and Indian War in which Native allies of the French killed 11 Moravian missionaries at Gnadenhütten, Pennsylvania (modern day Lehighton, Pennsylvania) on 24 November 1755. They destroyed the mission village and took one woman prisoner, and only four of the sixteen residents escaped. Following the attack, Benjamin Franklin was commissioned by the Pennsylvania Provincial Council to construct forts in the area, and in other parts of the Province of Pennsylvania, to defend against Native American attacks, which were becoming increasingly frequent due to the French and Indian War.

== Background ==
Moravian missionaries first established a mission at Friedenshütten ("Tents of Peace"), near Bethlehem, Pennsylvania in 1744, but in 1745 decided to move some distance northwest of Bethlehem, to a site they named Gnadenhütten ("Tents of Grace," often written Gnadenhuetten and sometimes referred to as "Gnadenhütten on the Mahoney" to distinguish it from Gnadenhutten in Ohio), near the junction of Mahoning Creek and Lehigh River. The new community grew rapidly, and in 1751 the missionaries were able to convert 61 residents from a nearby Lenape village called Meniolagomeka. The missionaries began translating hymns and "several parts of the Scriptures" into the Mohican language and the Mohawk language. A nearby plot of land was purchased and planted with crops, and a sawmill and a gristmill were built in 1747. The community was visited by Bishop August Gottlieb Spangenberg, Bishop John F. Cammerhoff, David Zeisberger, and Christian Frederick Post. By May 1749, over 500 Native American converts were attending church services in Gnadenhütten.

In 1752, representatives from the Nanticokes and Shawnee came to Gnadenhütten "to establish a covenant with the Brethren." Secretly, however, contact was made with Native American converts living in the community, and they were advised to move to Wyomick (Wyoming, Pennsylvania), as plans were being made, by Indians sympathetic to the French, to attack Gnadenhütten. In April 1754, 65 converts moved to Wyomick. Concerned for their safety, another 49 Lenape converts moved to Gnadenhütten from the village of Meniolagomeka. In June 1755, most of the community of Gnadenhütten relocated to "New Gnadenhütten," to the north of the Lehigh River, although many of the Lenape and Mohican converts remained south of the river.

Following General Edward Braddock's defeat on 9 July 1755 at the Battle of the Monongahela, Pennsylvania was left without a professional military force. Lenape chiefs Shingas and Captain Jacobs launched dozens of Shawnee and Delaware raids against British colonial settlements, killing and capturing hundreds of colonists and destroying settlements across western and central Pennsylvania. In October and early November 1755, the communities of Penn's Creek and Great Cove were attacked and destroyed by Lenape and Shawnee warriors.

During 1755, the Shawnee living in Wyomick had been affected by hunger, as game was becoming scarce due to overhunting. Gnadenhütten was also affected by food shortages after a May frost devastated the wheat crop, and the Moravians had to rely on a hundred bushels of corn sent from Philadelphia, however "deserters from the Moravian Indian congregation," who had moved to Wyomick, reported that there was "good living at Gnadenhuetten and abundant food to be had by all." This may have been a contributing motivation for the attack.

== Massacre ==
It remains unclear whether the attackers were Shawnee or, as some accounts indicate, Munsee. Some sources state that they were Lenape from a community on Nescopeck Creek. The attack on Gnadenhütten was initiated late in the evening on 24 November, when about a dozen warriors surrounded a mission house in which 16 people lived:

"The family, being at supper, heard an uncommon barking of dogs, upon which brother Senseman sent out at the back door to see what was the matter. On the report of a gun, several ran together to open the house-door. Here the Indians stood with their pieces pointed towards the door, and, firing immediately upon its being opened, Martin Nitschman was instantly killed. His wife and some others were wounded, but fled with the rest upstairs into the garret, and barricaded the door with bedsteads. Brother Partsch escaped by jumping out of a back window. Brother Worbas, who was ill in bed in a house adjoining, jumped likewise out of a back window and escaped, though the enemies had placed a guard before his door. Meanwhile the savages pursued those who had taken refuge in the garret, and strove hard to burst the door open; but, finding it too well secured, they set fire to the house, which was soon in flames. A boy...up on the flaming roof, ventured to leap off, and escaped;...Sister Partsch, seeing this, took courage and leaped likewise from the burning roof...Brother Fabricius then leaped also off the roof, but before he could escape was perceived by the Indians, and instantly wounded by two balls. He was the only one whom they seized upon alive and, having dispatched him with their hatchets, took his scalp, and left him dead upon the ground. The rest were all burnt alive...The house being consumed, the murderers set fire to the barns and stables, by which all the corn, hay and cattle were destroyed. Then they divided the spoils, soaked some bread in milk, made a hearty meal, and departed."

An article in the Pennsylvania Gazette of 4 December reports that the Shawnee attackers were only "about twelve in number," and that five people died in the burning house. A sixth man was killed trying to escape. A boy escaped by jumping from a window, and another man had left the house immediately prior to the attack, having gone to lock the chapel door, and was unharmed. Altogether, eleven missionaries are reported to have died.

None of the Native American converts were harmed, however they prepared to attack the assailants until a missionary told them to flee instead. David Zeisberger, who was on his way from Bethlehem to Gnadenhütten, heard the shooting from a distance but initially thought nothing of it until he observed the house in flames. He alerted the militia commander in Bethlehem, but as they had no idea how many attackers they were facing, they chose to wait until daylight to investigate.

Susanna Nitschman, Martin's wife, escaped from the burning building, and was captured and held prisoner in Tioga County, Pennsylvania for six months until her death.

== Aftermath ==
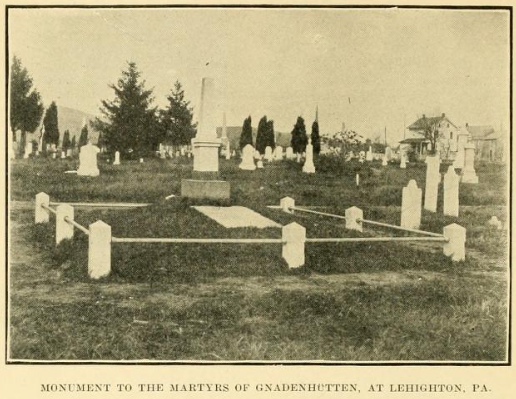
Gnadenhütten Massacre Memorial in Lehighton, Pennsylvania.

Colonel John Anderson arrived from New Jersey that night with a company of militia, but after being informed that over 500 Indians had swarmed the settlement, he waited until the following day to approach Gnadenhütten. A number of the Native American converts fled to Wyomick, while others were sent to Bethlehem to live with Moravians there. Throughout the French and Indian War they experienced significant poverty, and discrimination by the people of Bethlehem.

Governor Robert Hunter Morris ordered a company of 72 soldiers from Northampton County, under the command of Captain Hays, to guard the abandoned property at Gnadenhütten until it was safe for the residents to return. They built a small stockade for security, but on 1 January 1756, twenty of these troops were lured into a trap, ambushed and killed. The remaining soldiers fled and the stockade was burned. This led to generalized panic among settlers in the area, and Benjamin Franklin was commissioned in Philadelphia to investigate the situation and devise a plan for the defense of Pennsylvania against further attacks.

On 14 April 1756, Pennsylvania Governor Morris officially declared war on the Delaware Nation, offering a bounty of $130 for the scalp of every Lenape male over ten years of age and $50 for a Lenape woman's scalp, or $150 for a male Lenape prisoner and $130 for a female one, although an exception was made for the Native American converts.

Victims of the attack are buried in the Lehighton Cemetery, where a monument was erected in 1906.

== Fort Allen ==
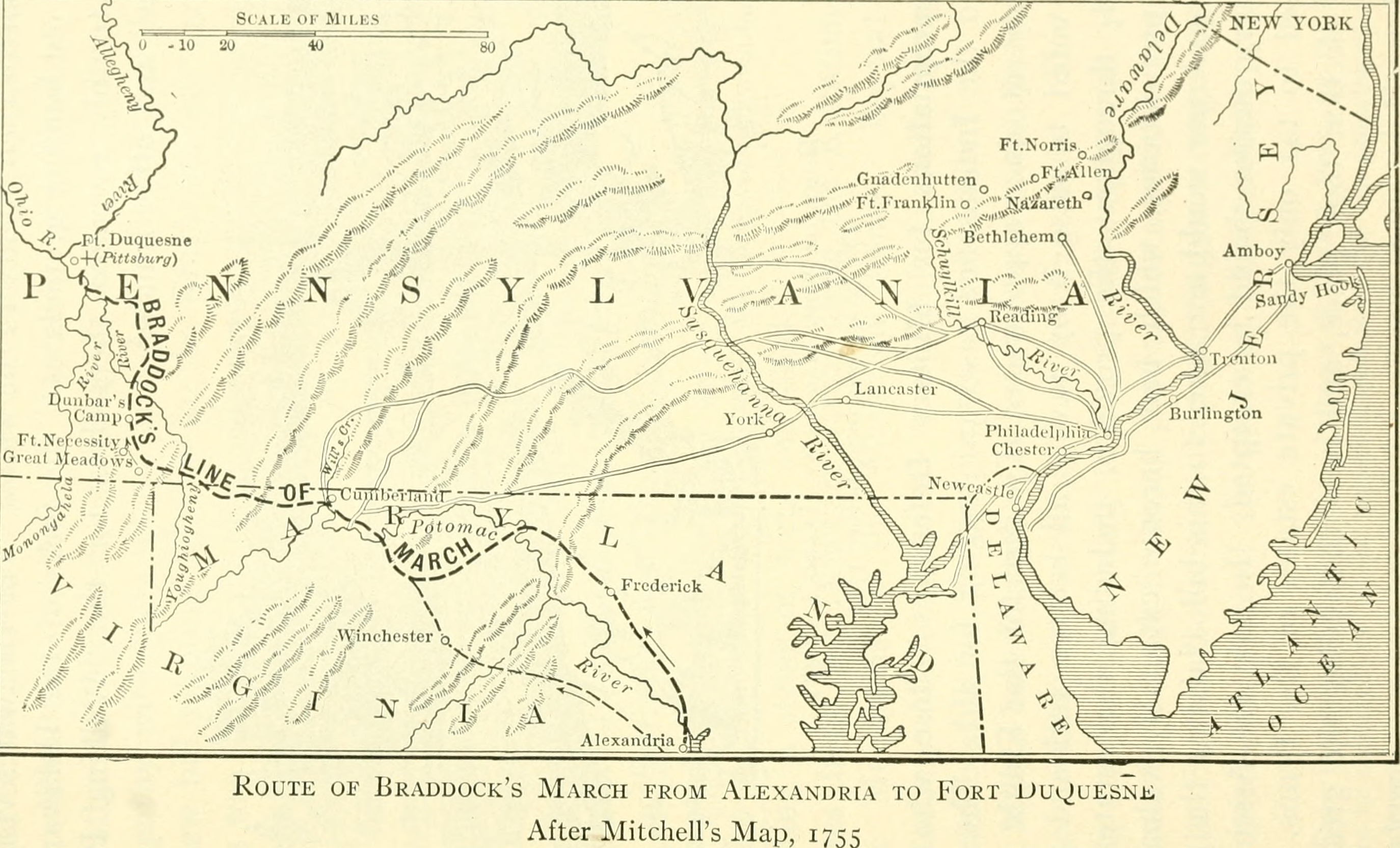
Map showing the location of Fort Allen, upper right quadrant, to the east of Gnadenhütten.

Attacks on settlements continued, and in December as many as 89 settlers were killed in the Northampton massacre.

In late 1755, Colonel John Armstrong wrote to Governor Robert Hunter Morris: "I am of the opinion that no other means of defense than a chain of blockhouses along or near the south side of the Kittatinny Mountains from the Susquehanna to the temporary line, can secure the lives and property of the inhabitants of this country." Benjamin Franklin visited Gnadenhütten in January 1756 to supervise the construction of Fort Allen. In his biography, he wrote that the Moravians had made preparations to defend Bethlehem and Gnadenhütten against further attacks:

"I was surprised to find it in so good a posture of defence...The principal buildings were defended by a stockade; they had purchased a quantity of arms and ammunition from New York and had even placed quantities of small paving stones between the windows of their high stone houses for their women to throw them down upon the heads of any Indians that should attempt to force their way into them. The armed brethren too kept watch, and relieved each other on guard methodically as in any garrison town."

Franklin and his men then built Fort Allen in less than a week. Situated on the northern slope of the Blue Mountain ridge near the Lehigh River, it was essentially a stockade surrounding a well, a barracks, a storeroom, and a gunpowder magazine. It was named for Judge William Allen who laid out Allentown in 1762. Franklin also supervised the construction of Fort Franklin and Fort Lebanon before commissioning William Clapham to build several other forts which proved essential to the defense of Pennsylvania during the French and Indian War.

== Memorialization ==
A memorial stone, listing the names of the missionaries who died in the massacre, was placed at the site on 10 December 1788. A historical marker was erected in 2005 by the Pennsylvania Historical and Museum Commission, in downtown Lehighton, Pennsylvania. A stone monument with a brass plaque marks the location of Fort Allen at Weissport, Pennsylvania. It was erected in 1922 by the Improved Order of Red Men of Pennsylvania, the public schools of Carbon County, and by grateful friends.

== See also ==
- French and Indian War
- Great Cove massacre
- Penn's Creek massacre
- Fort Allen
- Lehighton, Pennsylvania
- Pennsylvania forts in the French and Indian War
