= Daniel Brodhead II =

New York militia officer and pioneer (1693–1755)

- Born: April 20, 1693; Marbletown, New York, English America
- Died: July 22, 1755 (aged 62); Bethlehem, Pennsylvania, British America
- Occupations: Justice of the peace; militia officer; pioneer
- Known for: First permanent settler of European descent to settle in Stroudsburg, Pennsylvania
- Spouse: Hester Wyngart (m. 1719)
- Children: 4
- Relatives: Daniel Brodhead I (paternal grandfather)

Daniel Brodhead II (April 20, 1693 - July 22, 1755), was a captain in the Ulster County, New York, militia. He was the first person of European descent to permanently settle the area of Stroudsburg, Pennsylvania. He was a justice of the peace for Bucks County, Pennsylvania, from 1747 to 1749. He was friendly with the Native Americans as well as with the Moravian Church missionaries.

== Biography ==
He was born on April 20, 1693, in Marbletown, New York, to Captain Richard Brodhead (1666-1758) and Margriet Jans Matthyssen. On September 19, 1719, he married Hester Wyngart.

In 1737, Brodhead received a warrant of 600 acres in Bucks County (now Monroe County) along the east bank of the Analomink or Smithfield Creek, which is now named Brodhead Creek. The land is near where Lehigh Valley Hospital-Pocono now stands. An additional warrant for 150 acres on the west bank was given to Brodhead in 1750.

He was a justice of the peace for Bucks County, Pennsylvania, from September 25, 1747, to 1749.

He died on July 22, 1755, in Bethlehem, Pennsylvania.

== Legacy ==
He left each of his four sons: Daniel Brodhead, Garret, Luke, and John, 150 acres from his estate. Colonel Daniel Brodhead sold his land share to brother Garret. This became the site of the Flory home at 170 North Courtland Street, the oldest extant home in East Stroudsburg.
