= Pohopoco Creek =

River in Pennsylvania, United States

Coordinates: 40.90141°N 75.47768°W

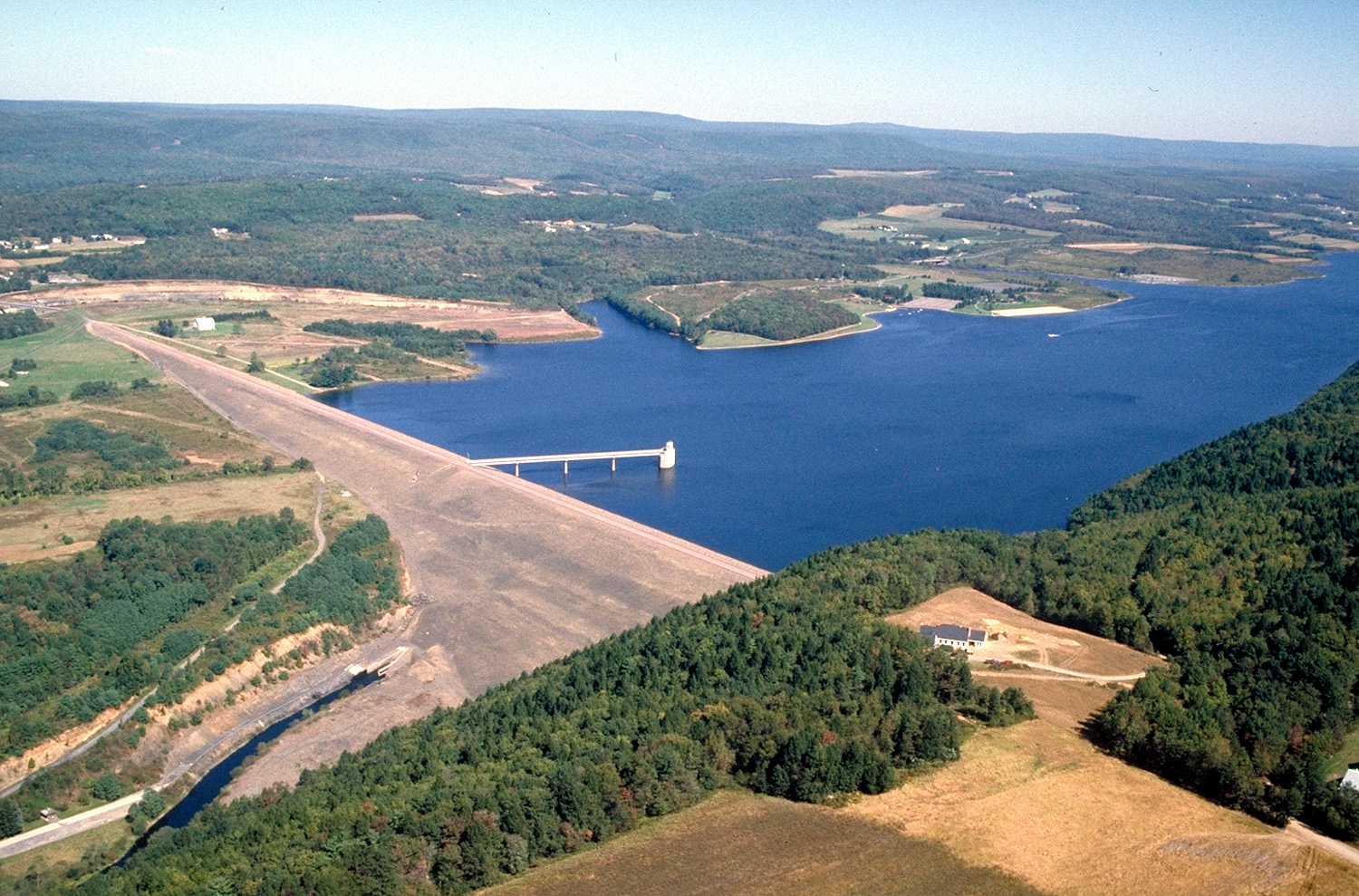
Beltzville Dam, impounding Beltzville Lake on Pohopoco Creek

Pohopoco Creek (locally known as Big Creek) is a tributary of the Lehigh River in Monroe and Carbon Counties in Pennsylvania in the United States.

It was historically known as Heads Creek, Pocho Pochto Creek, Pohopoko Creek, and Poopoke Creek.

== Description ==
The creek is 27.8 miles (44.7 km) long and its watershed is 111 square miles (287 km^{2}) in area. Beltzville Lake is formed by its damming by the U.S. Army Corps of Engineers and the Pohopoco's mouth is in Parryville.

== See also ==
- List of rivers of Pennsylvania
