= Fort Depuy =

18th century fort in colonial Pennsylvania

- Shawnee on Delaware in Monroe County, Pennsylvania
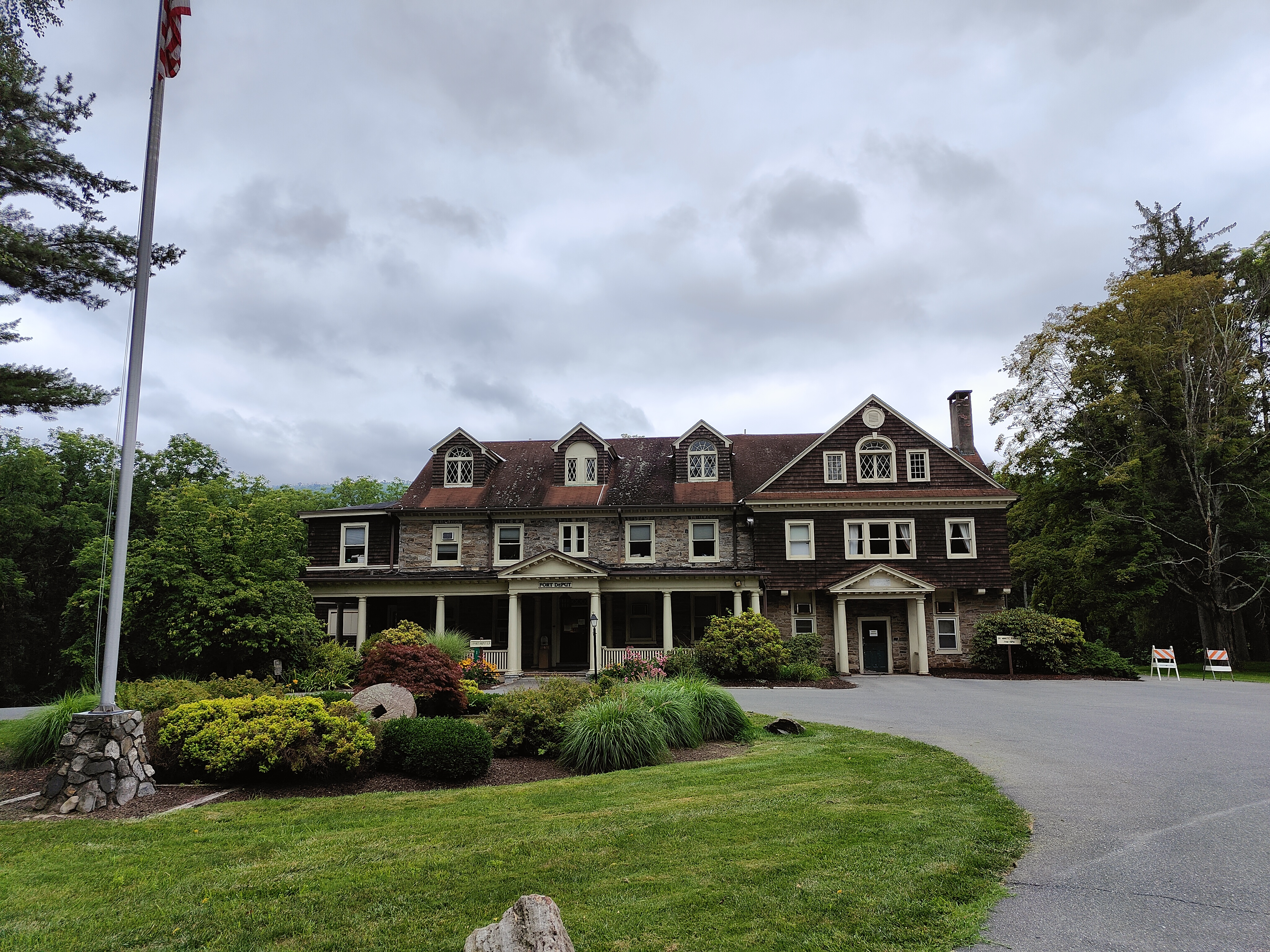
- Fort Depuy in 2023

Site information
- Type: Fortified homestead

Location
- Location of Fort Depuy in Pennsylvania
- Coordinates: 41°01′19″N 75°10′54″W

Site history
- Built: 1756
- In use: 1756–1758
- Battles/wars: French and Indian War

Garrison information
- Past commanders: Captain Isaac Wayne; Captain John Nicholaus Wetterholt; Lieutenant John Jacob Wetterholt; Ensign James Hughes
- Garrison: 18-26 men plus officers

Pennsylvania Historical Marker
- Designated: 1945

Fort Depuy, sometimes referred to in contemporary documents as Depui's Fort, Dupui's Fort, and various other spellings, is a fortified homestead located in Shawnee on Delaware, a village in Smithfield Township. It was one of many forts in Colonial Pennsylvania built in 1755 and 1756 during the French and Indian War following a series of attacks on local communities by Native Americans in December 1755. The fort never saw military action and was garrisoned from early 1756 until February 1757. After this, the fort was used only intermittently until the garrison was withdrawn to participate in the Forbes Expedition in May 1758. The fort was formally returned to the Depuy family in 1763.

== History ==
=== The need for fortifications ===
At the beginning of the French and Indian War, Braddock's defeat at the Battle of the Monongahela left Pennsylvania without a professional military force. Lenape chiefs Shingas and Captain Jacobs launched dozens of Shawnee and Delaware raids against British colonial settlements, killing and capturing hundreds of colonists and destroying settlements across western and central Pennsylvania. In late 1755, Colonel John Armstrong wrote to Governor Robert Hunter Morris: "I am of the opinion that no other means of defense than a chain of blockhouses along or near the south side of the Kittatinny Mountains from the Susquehanna to the temporary line, can secure the lives and property of the inhabitants of this country."

In December 1755, a series of attacks on people in the area east of what is now Stroudsburg had terrified the population, who then demanded that the Pennsylvania government provide military protection. On 10 December, a war party of about 200 Native American warriors attacked the Hoeth family farm and killed Frederick Hoeth, his wife, and seven of their eight children. The next day, warriors set fire to Daniel Brodhead's Plantation, and attacked and burned farms belonging to the Culvers, the McMichaels, and the Hartmanns. The Moravian mission at Dansbury was also destroyed. A number of settlers died when they were trapped inside burning buildings. Over 300 people fled to Bethlehem and Easton. In an account of the attacks from the Union Iron Works in Jersey, dated 20 December, 78 people are listed killed and about 45 buildings destroyed. On 25 December, the Provincial Commissioners reported that "The Country all above this Town, for 50 Miles, is mostly evacuated and ruined, excepting only the Neighbourhood of the Dupuy's, five Families, which stand their Ground."

In response to these attacks, the Pennsylvania Legislature placed Benjamin Franklin and James Hamilton in charge to erect a chain of forts along the Blue Mountain in the Minisink region.

=== Origin of the name ===
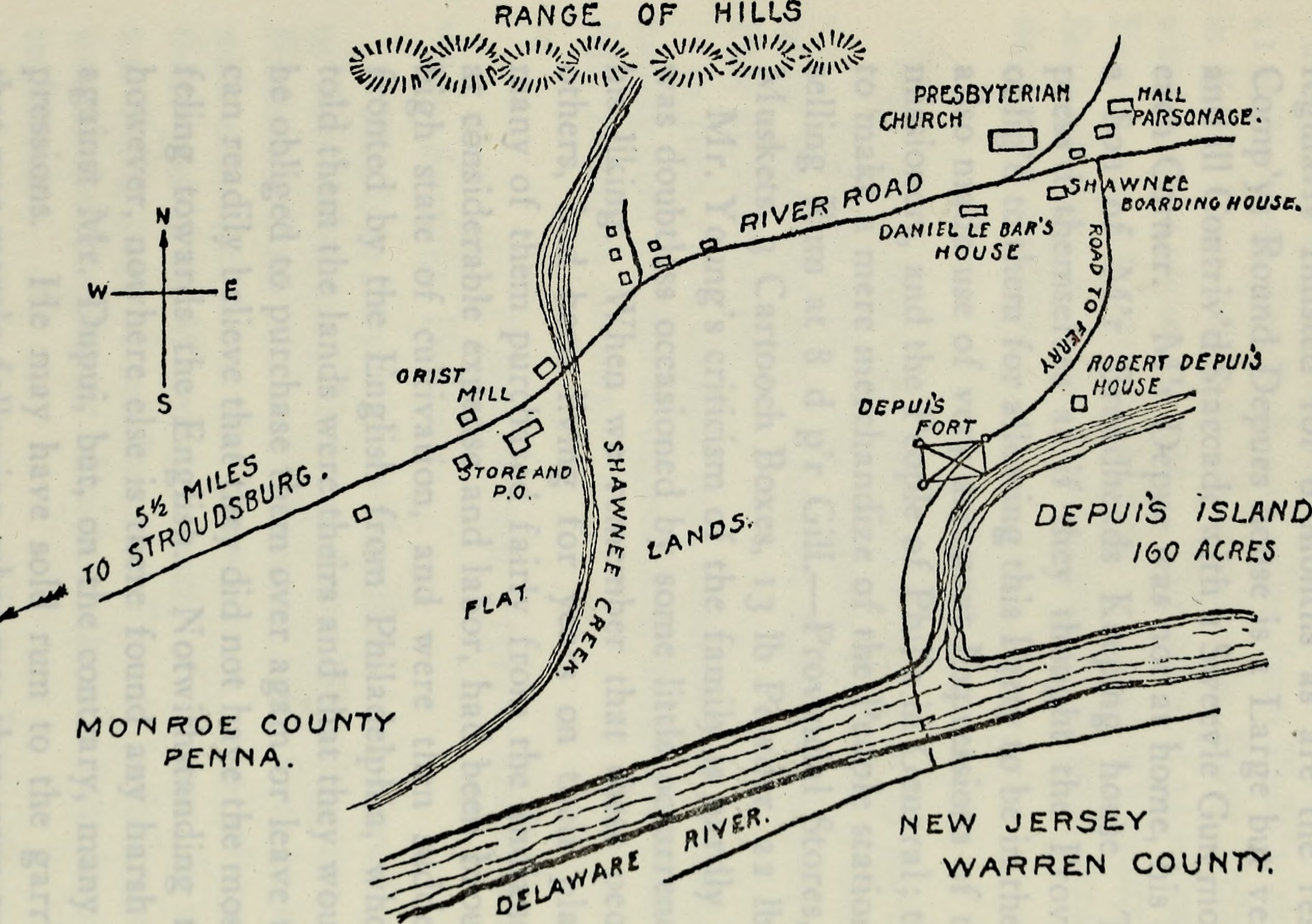
Map showing the location of Fort Depuy in Monroe County.

The fort was the fortified homestead on the farm of Nicholas Depuy (1682-1762), a French Huguenot who arrived in 1727 and purchased 3,000 acres from the Minsi Indians, a phratry of the Lenape tribe. The purchase included fertile land along the northwest bank of the Delaware River, as well as two large islands, Shawano and Manwalamink. Depuy built a log farmhouse on a bluff overlooking the river, in about 1734. This was replaced with a larger stone building in 1755. Because of its elevated position near a river, overlooking the district below and the roads to Easton and Bethlehem, colonial authorities felt that it would be "an admirable place of defence and refuge."

=== Construction ===
In 1755 Benjamin Franklin proposed that the Depuy home, because of its strategic location along the Delaware River, be commandeered to serve as a fort. Nicholas was living there with his son Samuel at the time and agreed to allow the troops to live in his home, although he insisted that they pay for rum and other supplies. Depuy was employed for a time as a commissary for the Pennsylvania provincial military.

In December 1755, Captain John Trump and Captain Isaac Wayne were sent by the Provincial Commissioners to fortify the homestead. The stockade was intended to provide protection for local settlers during Native American attacks. They were soon joined by Captain Jacob Wetterholt, who arrived with a garrison of 26 men, and they constructed a stockade around the building, placing swivel guns at each corner.

On 22 January 1756, Samuel Depuy wrote to a friend in New Jersey about the decision to turn over his home to colonial authorities:

"I am left in a deplorable condition...To leave all to Savage Enemies is hard...Therefore I am now come to this Resolution, that if Your Province will send me a Number of Men, with sufficient Officers to Guard me, I will give them the use of my Plantation, or otherwise...let them build a Fort...The two Capts. Trump and Astin, of this Province, with fifty men each...let me have twenty men...They are building a Fort One Mile West of Brodhead's."

=== Command and garrison ===
1770 map of the Province of Pennsylvania showing Fort Depuy on the red New Jersey border, to the left of the compass.

Major William Parsons visited the fort on 12 June 1756 and reported: "Samuel Dupui has a large commodious Stockado Fort round his House with 4 Swivels, one at each Corner; but the Fort is much exposed to a high Hill on the Land Side." The fort also served as a commissary base for the other forts in the area.

On 24 June 1756, Commissary General James Young visited the fort and reported: "Came to Saml Depues, Musterd that Part of Captn Weatherholts Compy that are Stationd here, a Lt. and 26 men all regularly Inlisted for 6 Months as are the rest of his Compy. Round Depue's house is a Large but very Slight, and ill Contriv'd Staccade with a Sweevle Gun Mounted on Each Corner."

Captain Wetterholt and most of the garrison were transferred to Fort Hamilton in September, and in November the captain's younger brother, Lieutenant Jacob Wetterholt, returned with a garrison of 18 men. They were sent back to Fort Hamilton in early February, 1757. The fort was garrisoned only occasionally during the rest of that year, until February, 1758 when a garrison of 23 men under the command of Ensign James Hughes was reported. On 2 March 1758, the fort was inspected by Colonel James Burd, who wrote: "This is a very fine Plantation, Situate upon the River Delaware...There is a pretty good Stockade here & 4 Sweevells mounted & good accommodation for soldiers. Reviewed this Garrison and found here 22 good men."

On 8 May 1758, Deputy Governor William Denny ordered the garrison to march to Bethlehem in preparation for the Forbes Expedition. The fort was briefly reoccupied in 1760 and again at the start of the Pontiac's War in 1763, and later that year it was returned to the family, and to its function as a farm.

== Modern site ==
In 1785, Samuel Depuy built the stone house that stands on the site today, near the site of his father's original home. He named the house "Manwalamink", after the nearby island. In 1898, the Depuy family sold the home to Charles Campbell Worthington, a New York businessman who built the Inn and Gatehouse. The site of the original stockade is slightly southwest, and no signs remain.

The Shawnee Inn & Golf Resort is located on the site of Depuy's farm.

== Memorialization ==
A historical marker commemorating Nicholas Depuy was placed in Smithfield Township in 1947 by the Pennsylvania Historical and Museum Commission. It is on River Road near DePuy Drive.

== See also ==
- Province of Pennsylvania
- Shawnee on Delaware
- Pennsylvania forts in the French and Indian War
