= Fort Allen (Carbon County, Pennsylvania) =

18th century fort in colonial Pennsylvania

- Franklin Township, Carbon County, Pennsylvania (near Weissport, Pennsylvania)
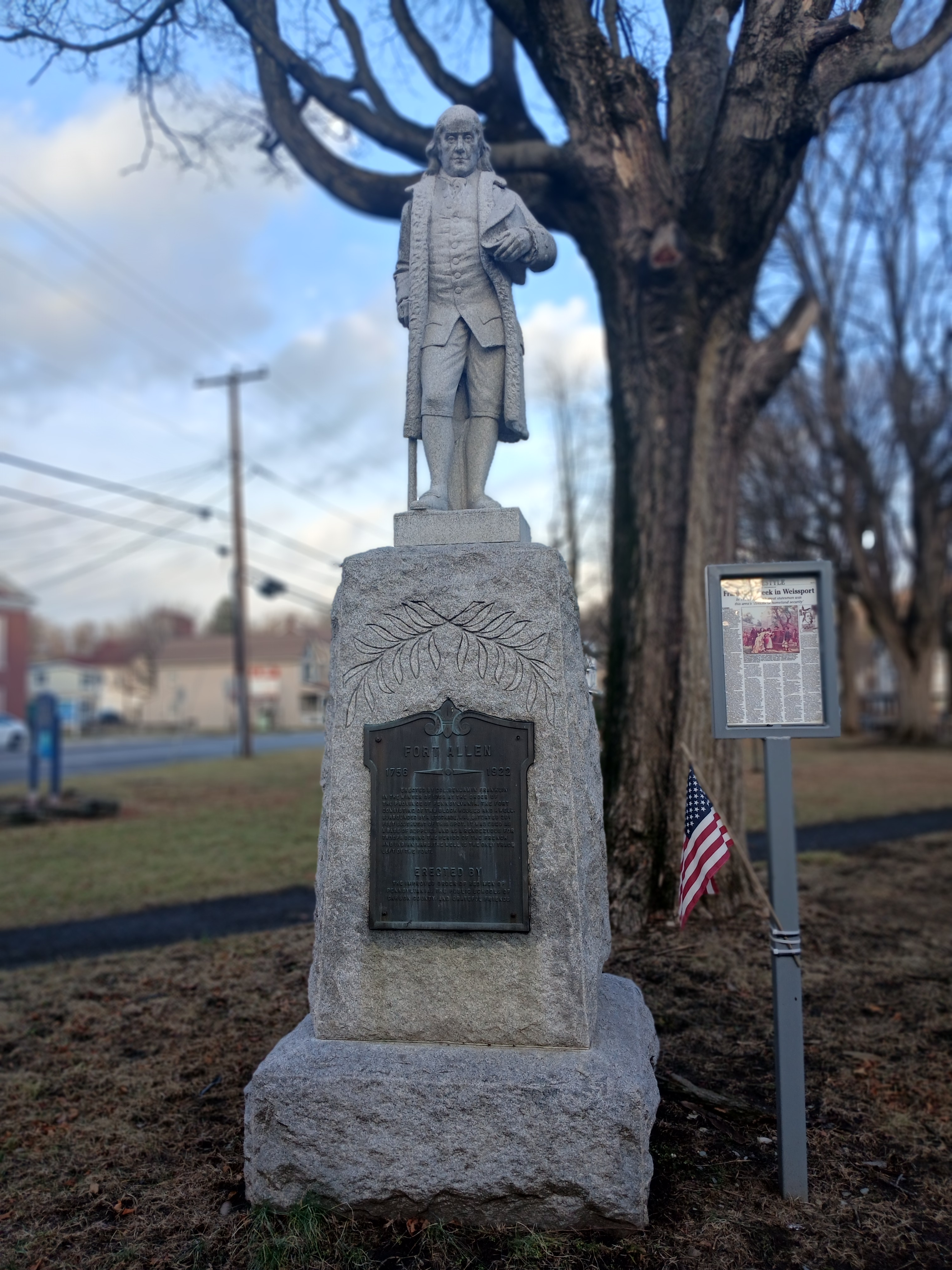

Site information
- Type: Military fort
- Controlled by: Borough of Weissport

Location
- Location of Fort Allen in Pennsylvania
- Coordinates: 40.82938°N 75.70281°W

Site history
- Built: 1756
- In use: 1756-1780
- Battles/wars: French and Indian War; Pontiac's War; American Revolutionary War

Garrison information
- Past commanders: Captain Isaac Wayne; Captain Charles Foulk; Captain George Reynolds; Captain Jacob Orndt; Captain John Bull
- Garrison: 15-75 men plus officers

Fort Allen was a military structure built in Franklin Township (in what is now Weissport), in Carbon County, Pennsylvania in 1756. It was first of several frontier defenses erected by Benjamin Franklin for the Province of Pennsylvania during the French and Indian War. The garrison was rarely more than fifty men, and the fort never saw combat, however it became a center of contact and trade with Native Americans and served as a stopping point for Indians traveling to and from Bethlehem, Easton and Philadelphia. It was abandoned in 1761 near the end of the French and Indian War, and briefly reoccupied during Pontiac's War and again during the American Revolutionary War.

== History ==
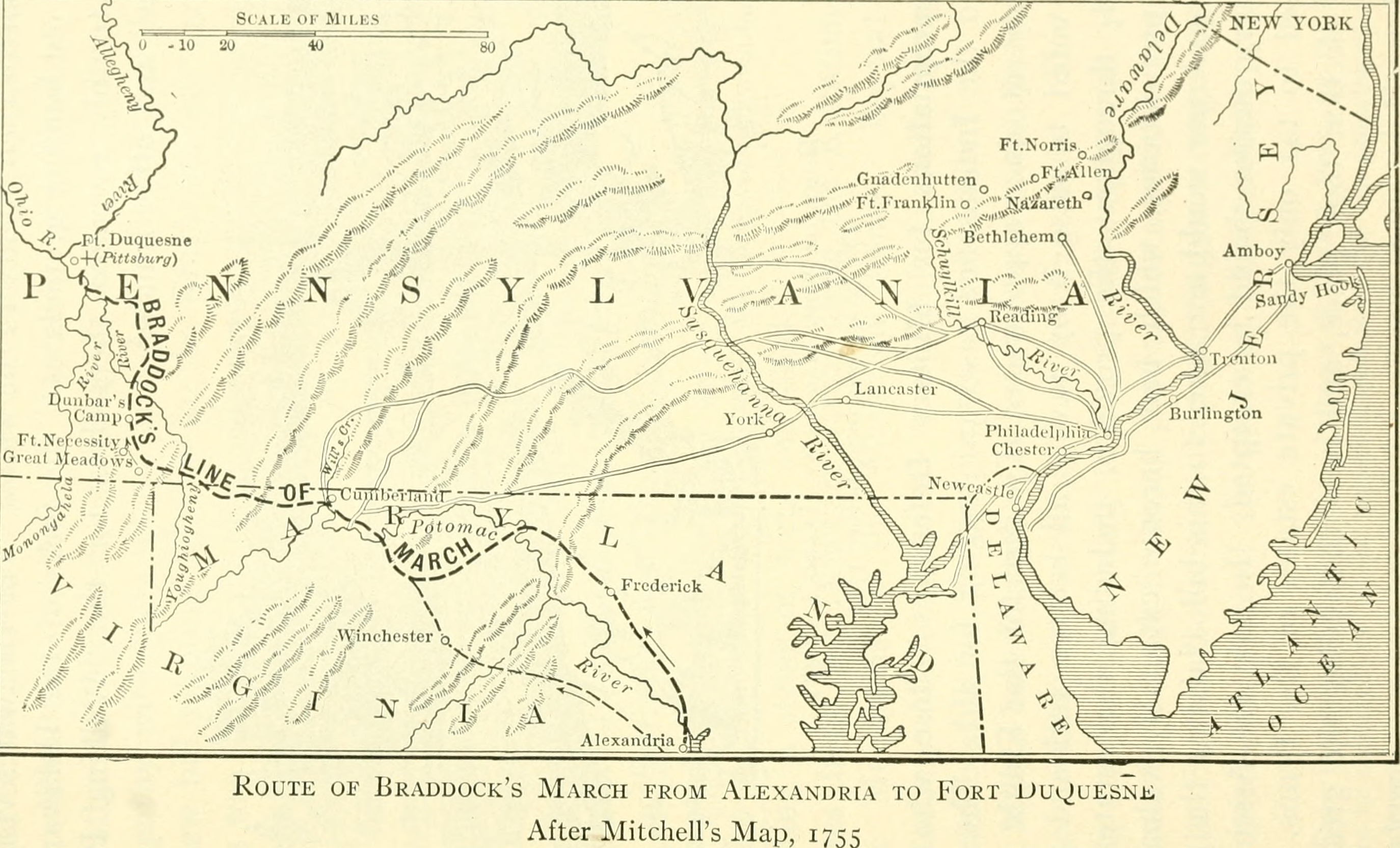
Map showing the location of Fort Allen, upper right quadrant, to the east of Gnadenhütten.

In late 1755, Colonel John Armstrong wrote to Governor Robert Hunter Morris: "I am of the opinion that no other means of defense than a chain of blockhouses along or near the south side of the Kittatinny Mountains from the Susquehanna to the temporary line, can secure the lives and property of the inhabitants of this country."

On 24 November 1755, Native American warriors destroyed Gnadenhutten near Bethlehem, Pennsylvania. On 26 November, the Pennsylvania Provincial Assembly authorized a grant of sixty thousand pounds for frontier defense. On 29 November, Moravian Bishop August Gottlieb Spangenberg wrote to Governor Morris that a fort was essential to the defense of eastern Pennsylvania, stating: "If the French come and...if they put a garrison in the gaps of the mountains, and make there also a fortification, you cannot come at them at all with any great guns." Governor Morris immediately sent troops, to build a stockade and to guard the abandoned farms in the area, but on 1 January 1756, they were ambushed by Lenape warriors and the stockade, along with most of the village, was burned. The Provincial Assembly then asked the Moravians in Bethlehem to construct a fort on land belonging to them, but the Moravians responded that they had little expertise in building forts and requested that the assembly provide a military construction crew led by a qualified architect. Benjamin Franklin was then commissioned to supervise the construction of Fort Allen.

=== Construction ===
1770 map of the Province of Pennsylvania showing "F. Allen" at the center right, just south of the Great Swamp. Based on a 1759 map by Nicholas Scull II.

In his biography, Franklin wrote that he and his 130-man crew built Fort Allen in only a week:

"It was the beginning of January, 1756, when we set out upon this business of building forts...I concluded to go myself with the rest of my forces to Gnadenhütten, where a fort was thought more immediately necessary...[We] arrived at the desolate Gnadenhutten...Our first work was to bury more effectually the dead we found there, who had been half interred by the country people; the next morning our fort was planned and marked out, the circumference measuring 455 feet, which would require as many palisades to be made, one with another of a foot diameter each. Each pine made three palisades of eighteen feet long, pointed at one end. When they were set up, our carpenters built a platform of boards all round within, about six feet high, for the men to stand on when to fire through the loopholes. We had one swivel gun, which we mounted on one of the angles, and fired it as soon as fixed, to let the Indians know, if any were within hearing, that we had such Pieces; and thus our Fort (if that name may be given to so miserable a stockade) was finished in a Week...This kind of fort, however contemptible, is a sufficient defence against Indians who had no cannon. Finding ourselves now posted securely, and having a place to retreat to on occasion, we ventured out in parties to scour the adjacent country."

On 25 January, Franklin wrote to Governor Morris:

"This Day we hoisted your Flag, made a general Discharge of our Pieces, which had been long loaded, and of our two Swivels, and Nam'd the Place Fort Allen, in Honor of our old Friend Judge William Allen, father of James Allen who laid out Allentown in 1762, and also Chief Justice of the Province. It is 125 Feet long, 50 wide, the Stocadoes most of them a Foot thick; they are 3 Foot in the Ground and 12 Feet out, pointed at the Top."

The finished fort was 125 feet long and 50 feet wide, with two triangular bastions, a 12-foot high palisade, and a surrounding trench. Inside there was a well, a barracks for the garrison, a storeroom and a gunpowder magazine. Two swivel guns were mounted at opposite corners.

=== Garrison ===
Fort Allen’s original garrison consisted of 50 men under Captain Isaac Wayne from the First Battalion of the Pennsylvania Regiment, however lack of training and discipline combined with the need for manpower on farms and homesteads contributed to desertion. Captain Charles Foulk took command in April, but being an inexperienced officer, he had little control over the men. Troops were often detailed to escort supply trains and traveling civilians. Pay for the troops was often delayed by bureaucracy under a Quaker-dominated government that opposed military force. By June 1756, when James Young, Pennsylvania’s commissary general, inspected the fort, he found only fifteen men present and no one commanding the post. In his report, Young states:

"This Fort stands on the River Leahy, in the Pass, thro' Very high hills & in my Opinion, in a very important Place, and may be of great Service, if the officer does his Duty. It is very well Stoccaded with four Good Bastions, on one is a Swivle Gun; the Woods are Clear all around it for a Considerable way, and is very Defencable; within is three good Barracks and a Guard Room; I found here 15 men without any officer or Commander."

The new commander, Captain George Reynolds, reported that the fort lacked guns, ammunition and powder. During subsequent years the garrison was maintained at around 75 men plus officers.

=== Contact with Native Americans ===
Trade had been seriously disrupted by attacks on settlements in 1755 and early 1756, but many Native American communities were anxious to maintain good relations with settlers and the provincial authorities. Delegations en route to Philadelphia began visiting Fort Allen regularly, as Bethlehem was still crowded with refugees from the attacks at Great Cove and Gnadenhütten. Native Americans preferred the relatively isolated location of the fort to local communities where tension and animosity were high at that point in the French and Indian War, especially among refugee settlers whose farms had been attacked and burned. Traders were attracted to the fort to sell rum, cloth, sugar and other goods, but no permanent trading post was established there until after 1758. An Iroquois delegation led by the Seneca leader Kanuksusy arrived in May 1756, on his way to a peace conference in Easton. By July 1756, when the Lenape leader Teedyuscung arrived, the fort was surrounded by temporary Native American dwellings.

=== Mutiny, 1756 ===
Teedyuscung had been invited to attend a peace conference in Easton, which the provincial government had arranged in order to discover the motivation behind Lenape attacks, and to try to negotiate a peace treaty. He was considered to be one of the most influential leaders of the Lenape, and was also well-known as a heavy drinker. Richard Peters described him as a "lusty rawboned Man, haughty and very desirous of Respect and Command" who could supposedly "drink three Quarts or a Gallon of Rum a Day without being Drunk."

On his way to Easton, Teedyuscung stopped at Fort Allen, under the command of Lieutenant Anthony Miller while Captain Reynolds was away in Philadelphia. Miller had a plentiful stock of rum, which he was willing to sell, and after Teedyuscung's money ran out, Miller tricked the chief into selling some deerskins which had been intended as a gift for Governor Morris. Trouble erupted when three Lenape women accompanying Teedyuscung became friendly with the lieutenant and his sergeants. A Corporal Weyrick objected to these activities and tried to remove the women from the fort. Violence followed, with Weyrick smashing windows and waving a cutlass. Weyrick and two other men assaulted Lieutenant Miller, raped the women, and during the next day, led other soldiers in a rampage during which they threatened to kill Miller and others who were defending him. Officers brought the situation under control on the following day, and Weyrick was arrested. Native Americans were thereafter forbidden to enter the fort, and the supply of rum was restricted to one gill (5 ounces) per day for the Indians.

Outraged, Teedyuscung left the fort, indicating that he would no longer participate in peace negotiations. Pennsylvania's new deputy governor, William Denny, sent Conrad Weiser to investigate. Weiser recommended that the fort's entire garrison and its commander be replaced, as the fort was being described as "a Dram Shop," and a "Tippeling House." Accordingly, the garrison from nearby Fort Norris was transferred to Fort Allen, under the command of Captain Jacob Orndt. Timothy Horsfield, a justice of the peace from Bethlehem, went after Teedyuscung and apologized, returning the deerskins Miller had taken from him. The chief accepted, but as a precaution, Captain Orndt had cabins built some distance from the fort, for Indians to stay in when visiting. Miller and Reynolds were both questioned, but charges against them were dismissed.

=== Later years and closing ===
In October 1756, a large band of Indians from Minisink arrived and camped near the fort. Thinking that they wanted to participate in peace negotiations, Governor Denny invited them to attend talks in Easton, but the Indians refused, stating that they only wanted to visit Fort Allen. Denny and other provincial leaders feared that they represented a threat, as there were over 140 warriors among them. Teedyuscung then announced during the peace conference in Easton that the Lenape were angry over the unfair acquisition of their traditional homeland during the 1737 Walking Purchase. Provincial authorities arranged for another conference in 1757 to discuss this matter, and the Indians left peacefully for the winter.

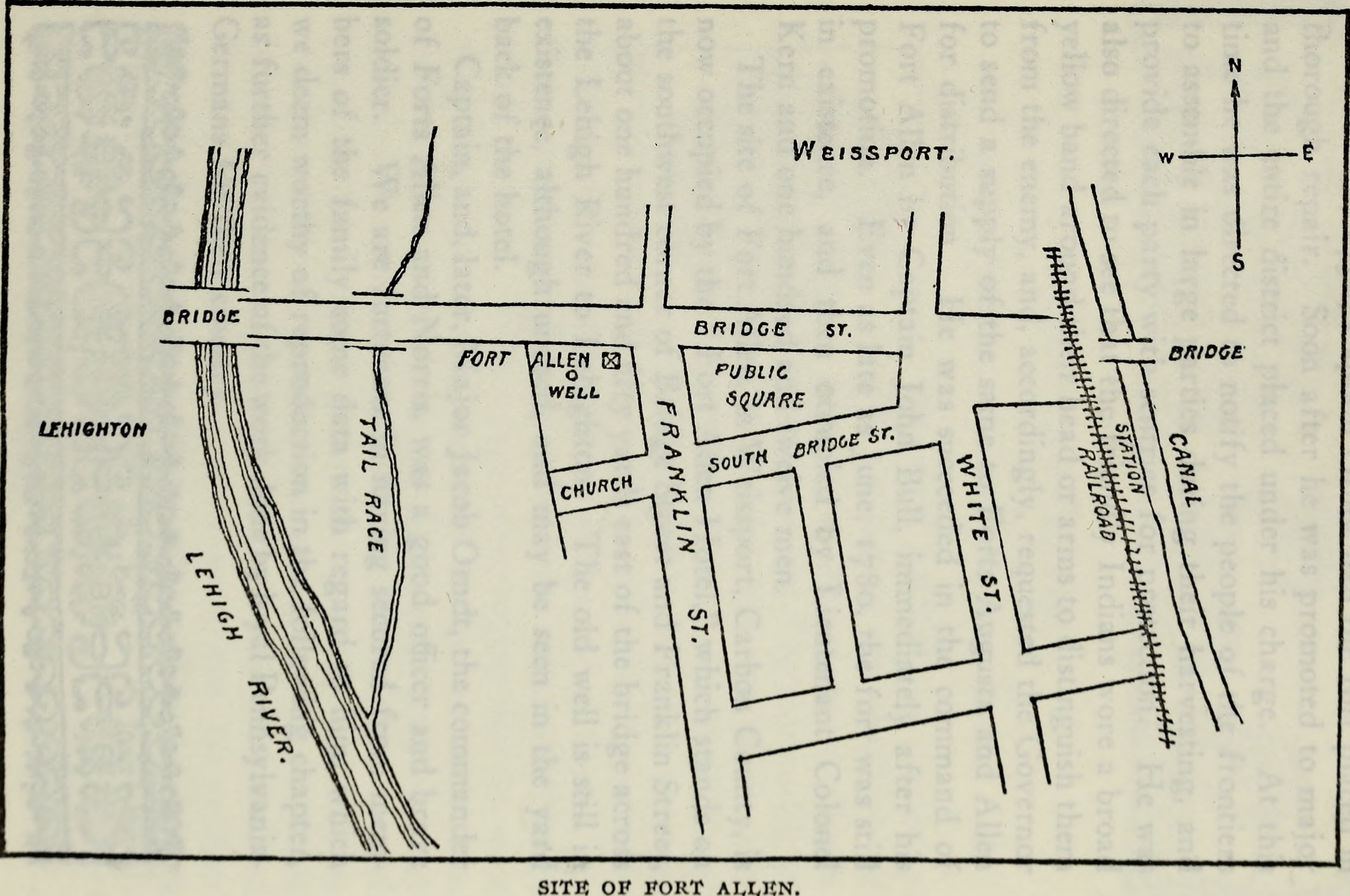
Location of the site of Fort Allen, showing the fort's well, in the town of Weissport, Pennsylvania.

During 1757, hundreds of Lenape, Seneca, and Indians from other tribes began arriving at Fort Allen. Teedyuscung arrived in July with over 200 Lenape men, women and children. Peace negotiations were progressing, and the provincial assembly wanted to cut expenditures by reducing garrisons and abandoning those forts that no longer seemed essential. Fort Allen was maintained largely because it provided a convenient location for Indians to stay on diplomatic visits to Easton or Philadelphia. Governor Denny described the fort as "the Place where the Susquehannah Indians are by Treaty obliged first to come to, when they arrive on Our Frontiers." Major James Burd visited the fort on 27 February 1758 and found it garrisoned by three officers and 75 men. He notes in his report: "This is a very poor Stockade, surrounded with Hills, situated on a barren plain, through which the River Leehy runs...There is scarce room here for 40 men." The garrison was reduced to 30 by June.

A trading post was established at the fort in April 1758, but traders there were prohibited from selling rum. In June, Captain Orndt was replaced by Captain John Bull, and by autumn, provincial authorities began to view the fort as superfluous, as hostilities with the Lenape became less frequent following the Treaty of Easton. By January 1760, the garrison was further reduced to two officers, two sergeants, and twenty-one privates. A few months later the decision was made to close the fort, and by January 1761, it was largely abandoned. On 27 April, Horsfield declared the fort closed and returned the land to the Moravians. In August, Indians attending the Easton conference raided the fort to loot its last remaining stores.

The fort remained standing, however, and was briefly reoccupied in 1763 during Pontiac's War. It was in use for a short time during the American Revolutionary War, when it was garrisoned in 1780 by 112 men under the command of Lieutenant Colonel Kern. The fort was dismantled by Colonel Jacob Weiss during the construction of Weissport in 1785. Today, the well is its only existing structure.

== Monuments and markers ==
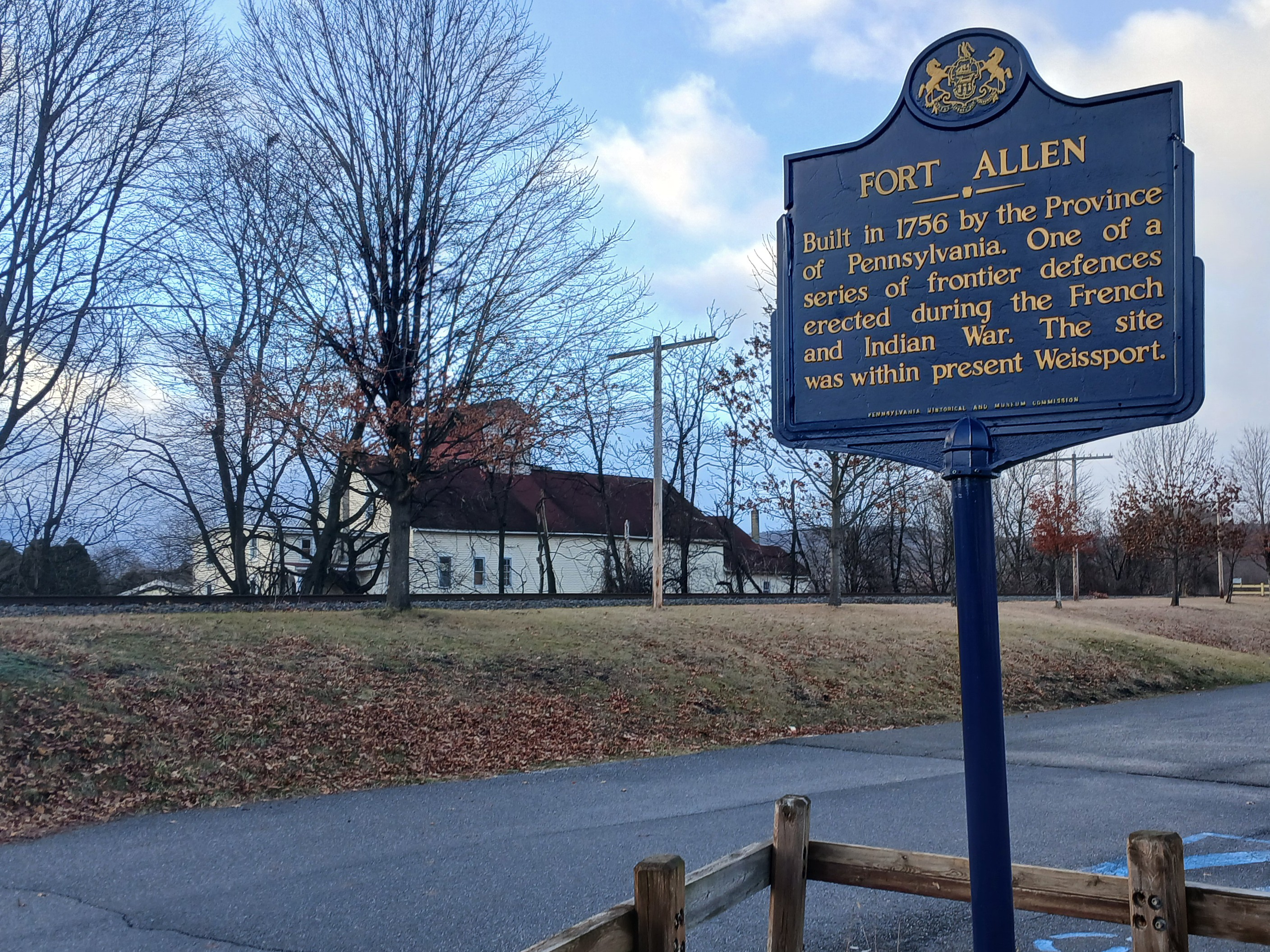
Historical Marker for Fort Allen

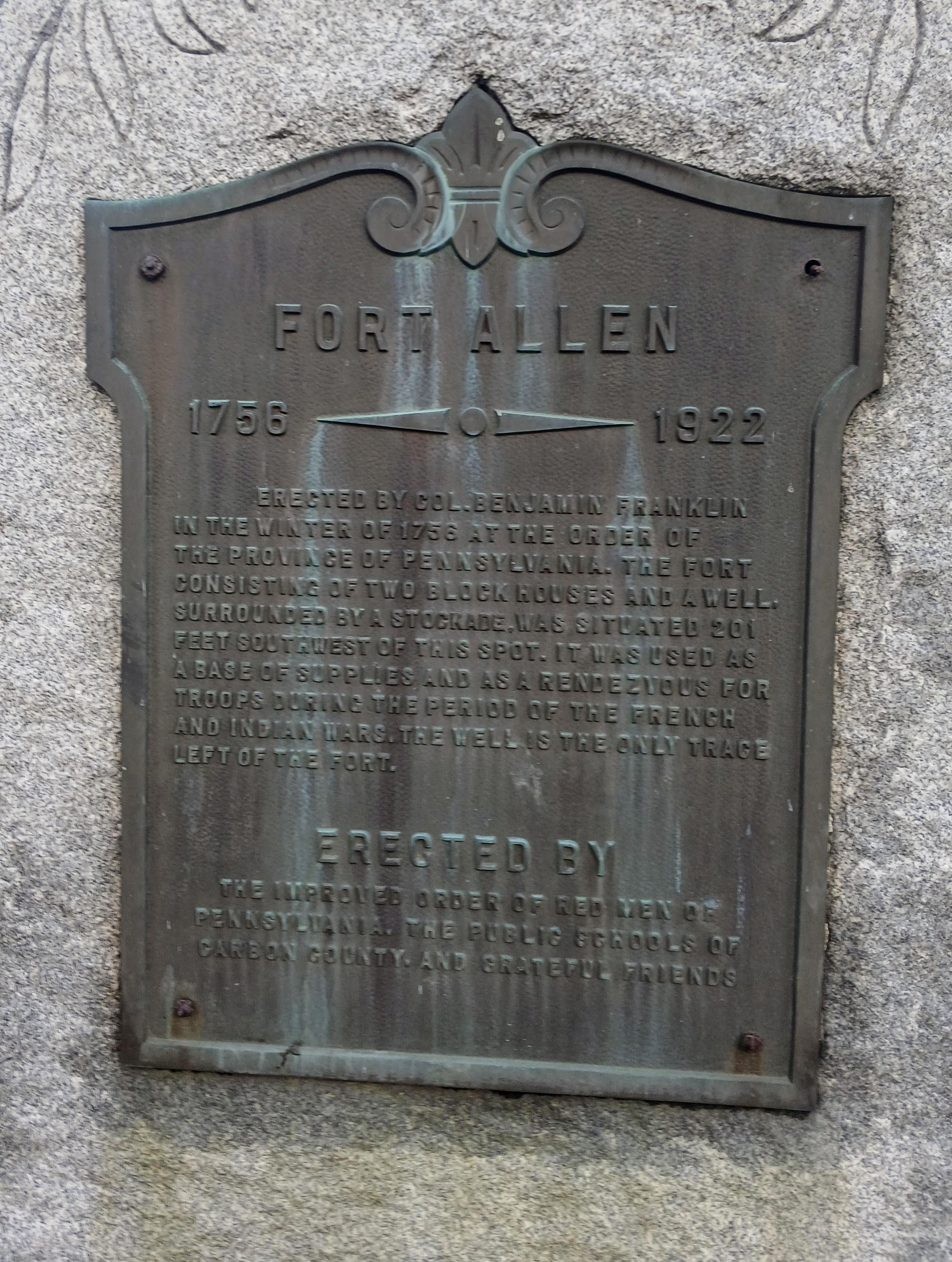
Detail of plaque in Weissport Borough Park

Three Pennsylvania state historical markers commemorate Fort Allen in Weissport Borough Park: one opposite 112–116 Franklin St., near the well, and a stone monument with a brass plaque and statue of Benjamin Franklin. The monument was sponsored by the Improved Order of Red Men of Pennsylvania, the public schools of Carbon County, and by grateful friends, and reads:

"Erected by Col. Benjamin Franklin in the winter of 1758 at the order of the Province of Pennsylvania. The fort consisting of the two block houses and a well, surrounded by a stockade, was situated 201 feet southwest of this spot. It was used as a base of supplies and as a rendezvous for troops during the period of the French and Indian Wars. The well is the only trace left of the fort."

A third Pennsylvania State Historical Marker for Fort Allen was placed in 1947 in Weissport's Lehigh Canal Park (located at the intersection of Bridge Street and D&L Trail). It reads, "Built in 1756 by the Province of Pennsylvania. One of a series of frontier defenses erected during the French and Indian War. The site was within present Weissport."

== See also ==
- French and Indian War
- Gnadenhütten massacre
- Teedyuscung
- Pennsylvania forts in the French and Indian War
