= Daniel Brodhead =

Continental Army officer and politician

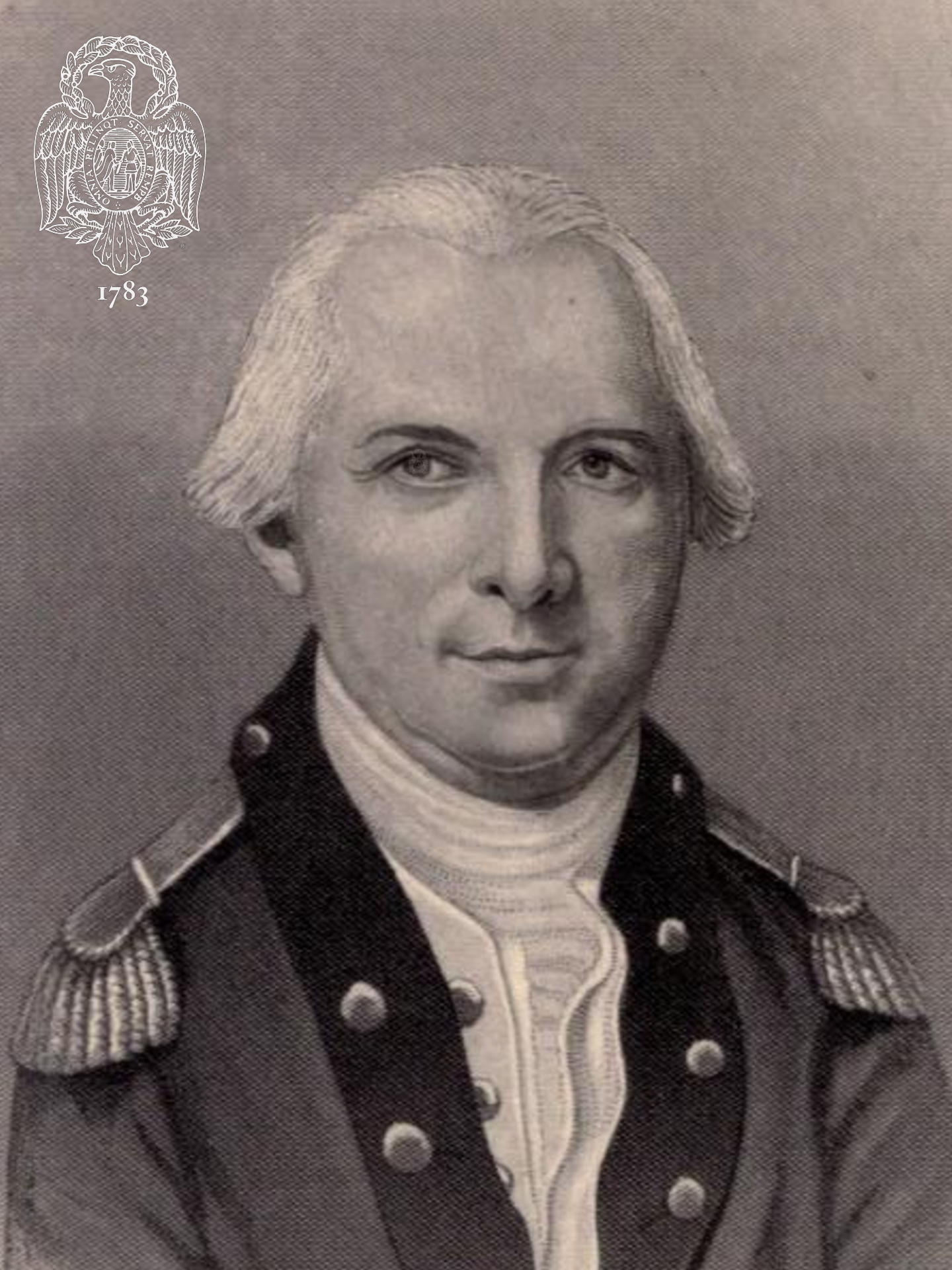
- 1880 portrait of Brodhead
- Born: October 17, 1736; Marbletown, New York, British America
- Died: November 15, 1809 (aged 73) Milford, Pennsylvania, U.S.
- Buried: Milford Cemetery
- Allegiance: United States
- Branch: Continental Army
- Service years: 1776–1783
- Rank: Brevet Brigadier General
- Conflicts: American Revolutionary War; Battle of Long Island; Battle of Bound Brook; Battle of Brandywine; Battle of Paoli; Battle of Germantown; Sullivan Expedition; Brodhead's Coshocton expedition
- Other work: Society of the Cincinnati; Pennsylvania Assembly

Brigadier General Daniel Brodhead (October 17, 1736 – November 15, 1809) was an Continental Army officer and politician who served in the American Revolutionary War.

== Early life ==
Brodhead was born in Marbletown, Province of New York, the son of Daniel Brodhead II and Hester (Wyngart) Brodhead. Brodhead's father moved his family to what is now East Stroudsburg, Pennsylvania, in 1737. Life in the frontier settlement was difficult, as Native American bands, mostly Lenape and Susquehannock, resisted settlers' encroachment. The Brodhead homestead was attacked by natives numerous times during Daniel's youth. When his father died in 1755, Brodhead was left with 150 acres from the estate.

In December 1755, the plantation was attacked and a barn and barracks burned, but Brodhead and his family succeeded in fighting off the attackers. Daniel Brodhead and his four brothers, Charles, Garret, John and Luke, along with his 12-year-old sister, Ann, fired at the attackers through windows of the Dansbury Manor. On 25 December, James Hamilton wrote to Governor Morris: "Broadhead's was stoutly defended by his sons and others, till the Indians thought fit to retire without being able to take it, or set it on fire, tho' they frequently attempted it. It is thought several of them were killed in the attacks."

He eventually sold his land share to brother Garret. This became the residence of the Flory family for many years at 81 North Courtland Street, the oldest home in East Stroudsburg. The home is now privately owned and renovated by Joel Smith.

== Marriage and family ==
Brodhead married Elizabeth Dupui of Northampton County in April 1756. To this union was born two children, Ann Garton Brodhead, and Phebe Brodhead Dewees. Upon the death of his first wife Elizabeth, he was married to Rebecca Mifflin the widow of Samuel Mifflin. Samuel's brother Thomas Mifflin was the first Governor of Pennsylvania. To this union was born two sons, Charles Brodhead and Richard Brodhead.

== Career and activities ==
Brodhead had a relatively unremarkable career before the American Revolutionary War. He farmed, ran a grist mill, and worked as a deputy surveyor for Pennsylvania.

In the years leading up to the outbreak of hostilities, Brodhead began to take part in the protest movements against British taxation. In 1774, Brodhead was elected to represent Bucks County at a provincial meeting held in Philadelphia on July 15, 1774.

=== American Revolution ===
In 1776 as war broke out, Brodhead was commissioned as an officer of the Pennsylvania State Rifle Regiment with the rank of lieutenant colonel. His first action came at the Battle of Long Island, where he was recognized by George Washington for his bravery and initiative. At the battle, Brodhead's only son, also named Daniel, was wounded and captured. He was later exchanged in 1778, and retired as a captain in 1779 from the 3rd Pennsylvania Regiment. After the Battle of Long Island, Brodhead became the acting commander of the remnants of the Pennsylvania State Rifle Regiment and the Pennsylvania State Battalion of Musketry, which were consolidated into a single battalion, the Pennsylvania State Regiment, and would later become the 13th Pennsylvania Regiment.

Brodhead took over command of the 8th Pennsylvania Regiment after the death of its commander, Aeneas Mackay, early in 1777 and was promoted to colonel. Brodhead led his troops during the Philadelphia Campaign in 1777 and wintered with the Continental Army at Valley Forge in 1777–78. “On the 5th of March, 1778, the regiment was ordered to Pittsburgh for the defense of the western frontiers, and by directions of Gen. Lachlan McIntosh, Col. Brodhead made, about the 12th of July, a detour up the West Branch to check the Indians who were ravaging Wyoming and the West Branch valley. He was at Muncy, on the 24th of July, and had ordered Capt. Finley’s company into Penn's valley, where two of the latter’s soldiers, Thomas Van Doren and Jacob Shedacre, who had participated in the campaign against Burgoyne, were killed, on the 24th, in sight of Potter's Fort, by the Indians. Soon after, Col. Hartley with his regiment relieved Col. Brodhead, and he proceeded with the 8th to Pittsburgh”. (Several histories incorrectly state that Washington sent Brodhead and the 8th Pennsylvania to rebuild and re-garrison the frontier outpost of Fort Muncy. However, in addition to the above information from the Pennsylvania Archives, the Orderly Book of the 8th Pennsylvania Regt and the Muster Rolls at Fort Pitt 1778 show that Brodhead led the 8th Pennsylvania regiment to Fort Pitt in the summer of 1778.)

Brodhead commanded the 8th Pennsylvania in Brigadier General Lachlan McIntosh's failed attempt to capture the British stronghold of Fort Detroit. On March 5, 1779, Brodhead replaced McIntosh as commander of the Western Department. His command included frontier forts such as Fort Pitt (Pittsburgh), Fort McIntosh (Beaver, Pennsylvania), Fort Laurens (near Bolivar, Ohio), Fort Henry (Virginia) (Wheeling, West Virginia), Fort Armstrong (near Kittanning, Pennsylvania), and Fort Holliday's Cove, along with dozens of lesser outposts.

The Wyandot, Mingo, Shawnee, and Lenape were allied with the British and regularly raided settlements on the Ohio Country frontier. The British also held Fort Detroit and other outposts, and had most of the Iroquois as allies. In addition, Brodhead faced a tenuous alliance with Iroquois tribes such as the Oneida who supported the Patriot cause as allies, a large population of Tory-sympathizing settlers, and a delicate truce with the Lenape. Its friendly chief had signed a treaty with the US as an ally.

From his headquarters at Fort Pitt, Brodhead directed numerous raids against hostile native tribes, often leading the offensives personally. His most famous raid was the Brodhead Expedition that was conducted against the Seneca tribe of the Iroquois Confederacy between August 11 and September 14, 1779. Brodhead left Fort Pitt with a contingent of 605 soldiers and militia to go into northwestern Pennsylvania. He followed the Allegheny River up into New York, where he drove the Seneca out of their villages. As most of the warriors were away fighting the Sullivan Expedition further east in New York, Brodhead met little resistance in destroying the villages, crops and people at the heart of the Seneca nation.

In April 1781, Brodhead led a successful expedition against the Lenape bands around the Muskingum River in the Ohio Country. In 1781, some of the Lenape ended their neutrality and sided with the British. In retaliation, Brodhead mounted the Coshocton expedition, invading their territory in central Ohio and destroying the main village of Coshocton in what is now east-central Ohio. His troops summarily executed 16 Lenape warriors who surrendered. As a result of Brodhead's campaign, the Lenape fled from eastern Ohio. They also vowed vengeance.

He retained command of the Western Department until September 17, 1781, when he was replaced by John Gibson. He had turned over command in May 1781, but returned in August and tried to regain control from Gibson, in the process arresting Gibson. However George Washington sent orders which led to Brodhead's permanent removal from command at Fort Pitt. Brodhead was removed from his command over allegations of mishandling supplies and money. Brodhead had made impressment (the forced sale of supplies) a policy. He had spent money intended for bonuses to recruit new militiamen to purchase supplies for his existing troops. Brodhead was acquitted of all charges except misspending the recruiting money. George Washington had been aware of the impressment and had given his tacit approval, as the Continental Army was struggling to keep going. Furthermore, the court martial ruled Brodhead justified in spending the recruiting money on supplies, and he was not punished.

A short time later, George Washington brevetted him a brigadier general. Brodhead spent the remainder of the war as commander of the 1st Pennsylvania Regiment.

== Later life ==
After the war, Brodhead, by then a widower, married Rebecca Mifflin, the widow of General Samuel Mifflin. Brodhead was one of the founders of the Society of the Cincinnati. He later served in the Pennsylvania General Assembly. On November 13, 1789, he was appointed Surveyor General of Pennsylvania and held the post for the next eleven years.

He died at Milford, Pennsylvania, and was buried in the Milford Cemetery.
