= Philippe-Thomas Chabert de Joncaire =

French army officer and interpreter

- Born: c. 1707
- Died: c. 1766 (aged 58–59)
- Occupation(s): French army officer Iroquois interpreter
- Known for: Establishment of Fort Machault
- Father: Louis-Thomas Chabert de Joncaire
- Relatives: Daniel-Marie Chabert de Joncaire de Clausonne (brother)

Philippe-Thomas Chabert de Joncaire (c. 1707 – c. 1766), also known as Nitachinon by the Iroquois, was a French army officer and interpreter in New France who established Fort Machault in the 18th century. During his career, he largely served as a diplomat with the indigenous nations rather than as a soldier.

== Early life ==
Philippe-Thomas Chabert de Joncaire was the eldest son of Louis-Thomas Chabert de Joncaire and Marie-Madeleine Le Gay. He was baptized in Montreal on January 9, 1707. He was the older brother of Daniel-Marie Chabert de Joncaire de Clausonne.

Joncaire was given by his father to the Seneca at the age of 10 and was raised by the Iroquois.

== Career ==
=== Early career ===
Joncaire joined the colonial French army in 1726 and attained the rank of second ensign in 1727. On July 23, 1731, he married Madeleine Renaud Dubuisson.

In 1735, Joncaire succeeded his father as the principal interpreter and political agent from New France to the Iroquois. His responsibilities included easing tensions between the indigenous peoples and the French when either side acted aggressively. He also negotiated a deal for the Senecas to supply Fort Niagara with fresh meat. By 1744, his successes resulted in the offering of a dead-or-alive reward by the British.

=== Céloron expedition ===
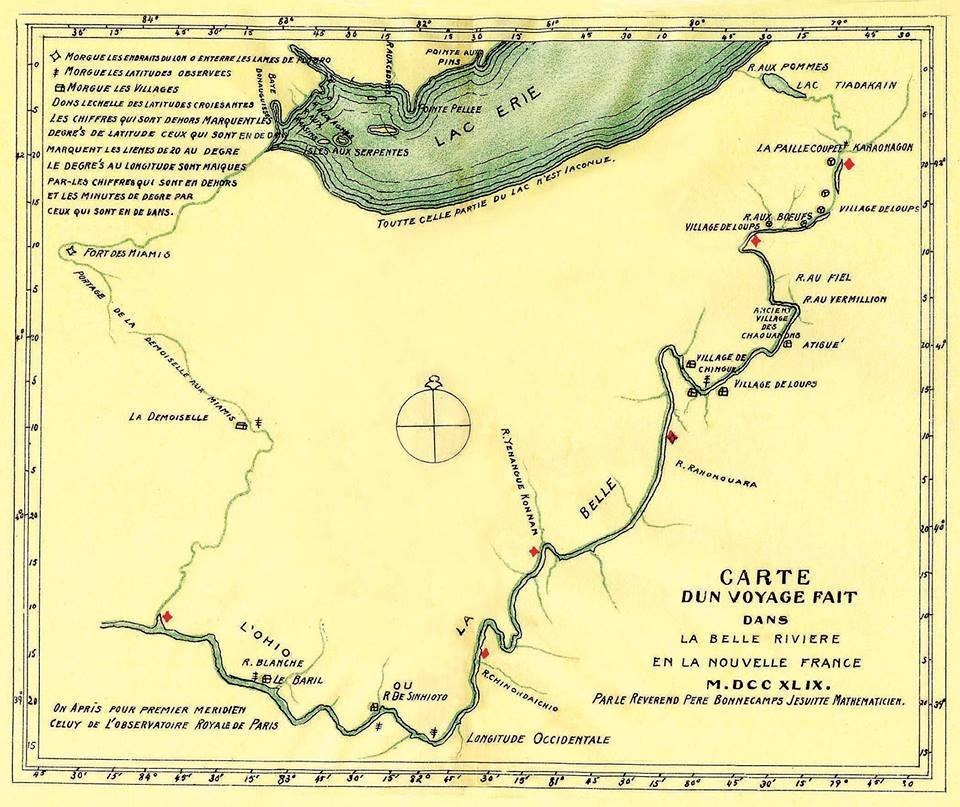
Map of the route followed by Pierre Joseph Céloron de Blainville along the Ohio River in 1749, drawn by Joseph Pierre de Bonnecamps. "Sinhioto" appears at the lower edge.

Joncaire resigned his post on the frontier in 1748 with a claim of ill health, two years after the death of his wife. The following year, he was recalled to be the interpreter for Pierre-Joseph Céloron de Blainville's expedition along the Ohio River. He was captured in Sonioto by Shawnees while establishing first contact and was nearly killed before the intervention of a Iroquois chief.

=== Chiningué ===
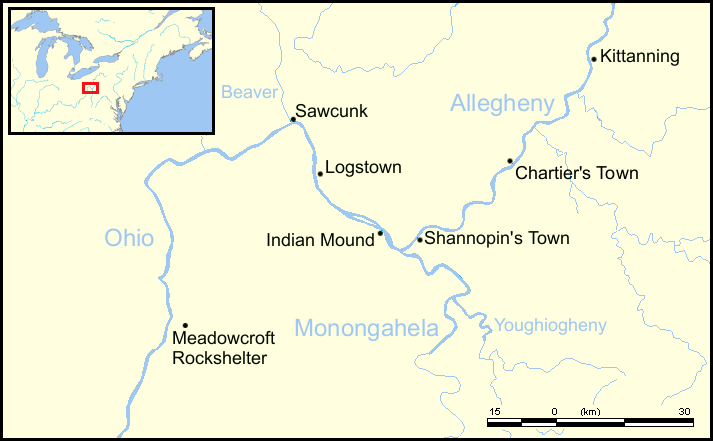
Chiningué (Logstown) and other Native American villages, most circa 1750s

In early July 1750, Joncaire was sent with 12 soldiers to Chiningué to establish a permanent French base. He found that the native population preferred the traders from Pennsylvania and Virginia over the French. By 1751, Joncaire held the rank of captain in the French colonial army. When larger French forces arrived with Paul Marin de la Malgue in 1753, he found support among the local Delaware and Shawnee who wanted to challenge the Iroquois.

=== Fort Machault ===
In 1752, Marquis Duquesne was appointed Governor General of New France and began a campaign to remove British traders from the Ohio Country, as "the nations of these localities are very badly disposed towards the French, [having been]...seduced by the allurements of cheap merchandise furnished by the English." In August 1753, the French decided to occupy the trading post and gunsmith shop owned by John Fraser, which Fraser had operated since 1740, and from which Fraser was absent at the time. The Lenape chief Custaloga assisted the French by capturing and handing over two traders who had just arrived at the trading post. Fraser and his employee William were forced to flee, and 75 French soldiers took over Fraser's cabin, allowing Custaloga to confiscate Fraser's trade goods. Fraser's cabin was occupied by Joncaire. By the next year Fraser's cabin and his forge had been incorporated by the French into the new Fort Machault.

In 1753, Governor Jean de Lauson decided to build a fortified trading post at the confluence of the Allegheny River and French Creek at Venango.

In December 1753, Major George Washington arrived at Fort Machault on an expedition to deliver British demands and assess the French military situation. Joncaire met with Washington, Guyasuta, and Tanacharison on December 4, 1753. Joncaire directed Washington to his superior officer at Fort LeBoeuf but informed Washington during a dinner that "he had the Command of the Ohio."

In 1754, Philippe-Thomas was replaced by Michel Maray de La Chauvignerie as the officer in charge of constructing the fort, which was eventually renamed Fort Machault.

== Later life ==
After the fall of Montreal to the British in 1760, Joncaire went to France and was knighted in the Order of Saint Louis.

Joncaire had died by 9 November 1766, soon after the end of the Seven Years' War. (Note: Some sources state that he died in Canada, while others state that it was unclear whether he returned to Canada.)

== See also ==
- Tanacharison
