= Louis-Thomas Chabert de Joncaire =

French Army officer and interpreter

- Born: 1670; Saint-Rémy-de-Provence, France
- Died: June 29, 1739 (aged 68–69); Fort Niagara, New France
- Occupations: Army officer Haudenosaunee interpreter
- Known for: Great Peace of Montreal; Establishment of Fort Niagara
- Children: Philippe-Thomas Chabert de Joncaire; Daniel-Marie Chabert de Joncaire de Clausonne

Louis-Thomas Chabert de Joncaire (French pronunciation: [lwi tɔma ʃabɛʁ də ʒɔ̃kɛʁ]; 1670 – June 29, 1739), also known as Sononchiez by the Haudenosaunee, was a French army officer and interpreter for New France who worked with the Haudenosaunee during the French and Indian Wars in the early 18th century. He helped negotiate the Great Peace of Montreal in 1701 and founded Fort Niagara in 1720.

== Early life ==
Louis-Thomas Chabert de Joncaire was born in 1670 in Saint-Rémy-de-Provence, France, to esquire Antoine-Marie de Joncaire and Gabrielle Hardi. Joncaire came to Canada in approximately 1687 as a cavalry sergeant in the Governor General's Guard.

== Career as an interpreter ==
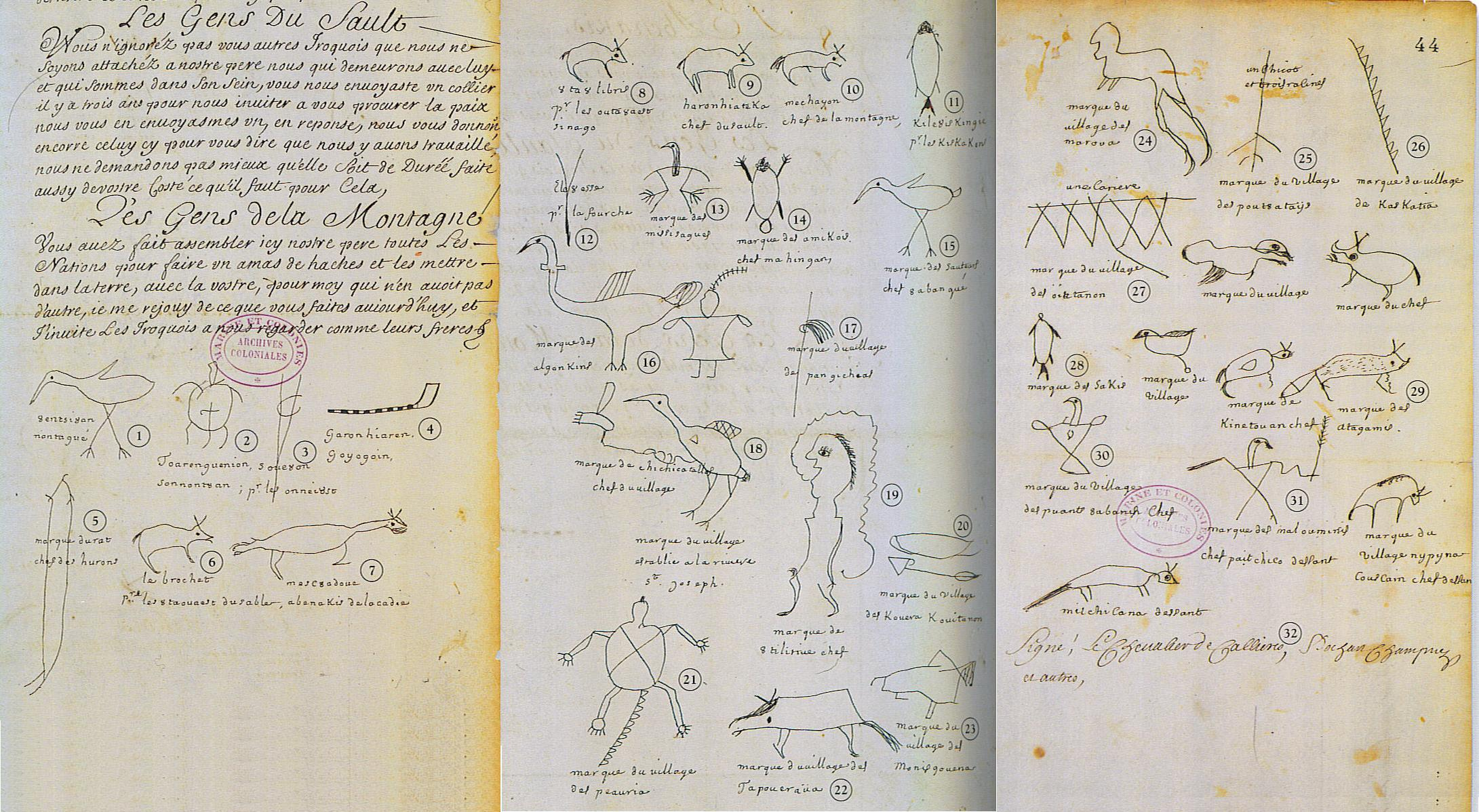
A copy of the Great Peace of Montreal, which ended hostilities between New France and 39 First Nations

Soon after his arrival in Canada, he was captured by members of the Seneca tribe. According to his son Daniel, Joncaire was tortured by the tribe and en route to execution at a stake, but was saved when a woman of the tribe adopted him. During Joncaire's captivity, a cordial relationship was established between him and the Haudenosaunee which continued until his death. The Seneca befriended and trusted Joncaire while Joncaire mastered the Seneca language. By virtue of his diplomatic qualities, he became a valuable auxiliary for New France. After his release, Joncaire had a permanent post near modern-day Geneva, New York, and a home in Montreal.

Beginning in the summer of 1700, Joncaire, Father Bruyas, and Paul Le Moyne de Maricourt were significantly involved in the peace discussions that led to the Great Peace of Montreal of 1701 that ended the second Beaver War. Joncaire successfully negotiated a peace between New France, the Onondaga, Seneca, and other Haudenosaunee tribes (except for the Mohawks).

During the War of the Spanish Succession beginning in 1702, Joncaire preserved Haudenosaunee neutrality by alternatingly presenting gifts to the Seneca and threatening the Seneca with attacks from their western Native American neighbors if they were to break their treaty with New France. In the summer of 1709 during Queen Anne's War, Joncaire and his men assassinated Louis Montour (relative of Madame Montour) on Governor Vaudreuil's orders. Montour was urging the Seneca to grant right-of-way to their western neighbors on the behalf of the New York-based traders who employed him, which threatened the French control over the Seneca.

In August 1711, when New France was threatened by an attack from the English, Joncaire and Michel Maray de La Chauvignerie convinced several Native American tribes to renew their alliance with New France at a banquet in Montreal by singing a Haudenosaunee war song.

== Fort Niagara ==
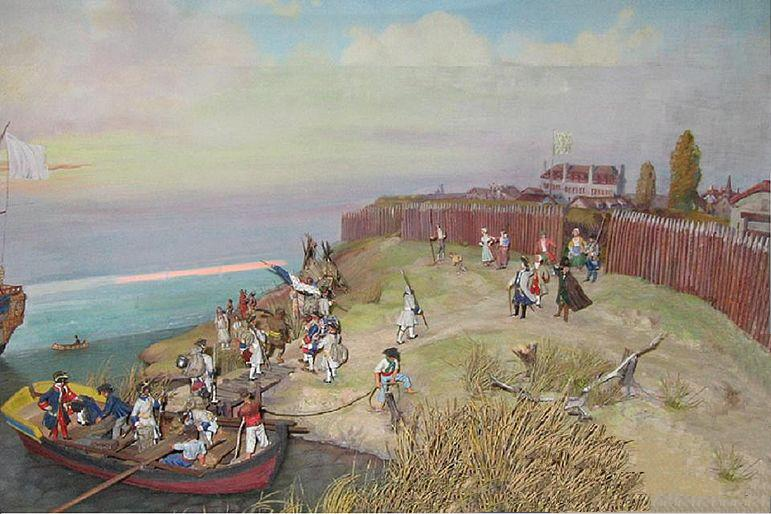
Painting of Fort Niagara in 1728

In early 1720, Vaudreuil assigned Joncaire the task of acquiring permission from the Seneca to construct a French post to defend against a planned English occupation of the area around Niagara Falls. Joncaire convened a meeting of Seneca chiefs and informed them of his desire to have his own house so that he could visit them more frequently. The chiefs told Joncaire that he could construct a house at any location of his choice, so he recruited eight soldiers from Fort Frontenac to construct Fort Niagara roughly eight miles below the Niagara Falls on the east side of the Niagara River. The trading post that they constructed is in modern-day Lewiston, New York.

Joncaire gained permission from the Haudenosaunee to expand Fort Niagara from a trading house to a wooden stockade capable of holding 300 men. He served as the commander of Fort Niagara until 1726. (Note: The 1948 Encyclopedia of Canada says that he was the commandant of Fort Niagara until 1730.)

== Later life and death ==
In 1731, Joncaire was tasked by Governor Charles de la Boische, Marquis de Beauharnois to lead a group of Shawnee migrants from the Susquehanna River to the Allegheny River and prevent them from trading with the English. He was also instructed to convince them to move even further west with a preference for Detroit where there was greater French influence. Joncaire died at Fort Niagara on June 29, 1739, during this task.

== Personal life and family ==
According to Bacqueville de la Potherie, Joncaire married a Haudenosaunee woman in the 1690s.

Joncaire married the 17-year-old Marie-Madeleine Le Gay on March 1, 1706, in Montreal when he was 36 years old. Marie-Madeleine Le Gay was the daughter of Jean-Jérôme Le Gay, Sieur de Beaulieu, a merchant and bourgeois of Montreal, and Madeleine Just. Joncaire and Le Gay had ten children between 1707 and 1723.

Joncaire's eldest son with Le Gay, Philippe-Thomas Chabert de Joncaire, was given by his father to the Seneca at the age of 10 in 1717, had a Haudenosaunee upbringing, and later served as a captain in the colonial French army. In 1753, Governor Jean de Lauson sought to build a fortified trading post at the confluence of the Allegheny River and French Creek at Venango. That year, the English traders were expelled from Venango and Philippe-Thomas Chabert de Joncaire established Fort d'Anjou at the location. Philippe-Thomas was replaced by Michel Maray de La Chauvignerie as the officer in charge of constructing the fort, which eventually became Fort Machault. He died in Canada soon after the end of the Seven Years' War.

Another of their sons, Daniel-Marie Chabert de Joncaire de Clausonne, was also an army officer and interpreter in New France. He established Fort du Portage near Niagara Falls and fought in the Battle of Fort Niagara during the French and Indian War. After leaving for France, he was implicated in the Canada Affair and imprisoned in the Bastille, before returning to America and then dying in Detroit in 1771.

== Legacy ==
The location of the initial trading post that Joncaire commanded near Fort Niagara in 1720 is commemorated by a New York State Historic Marker for "Fort Joncaire" in Lewiston, New York.

== See also ==
- Kondiaronk
- Lower Landing Archeological District
