= George Washington in the French and Indian War =

George Washington
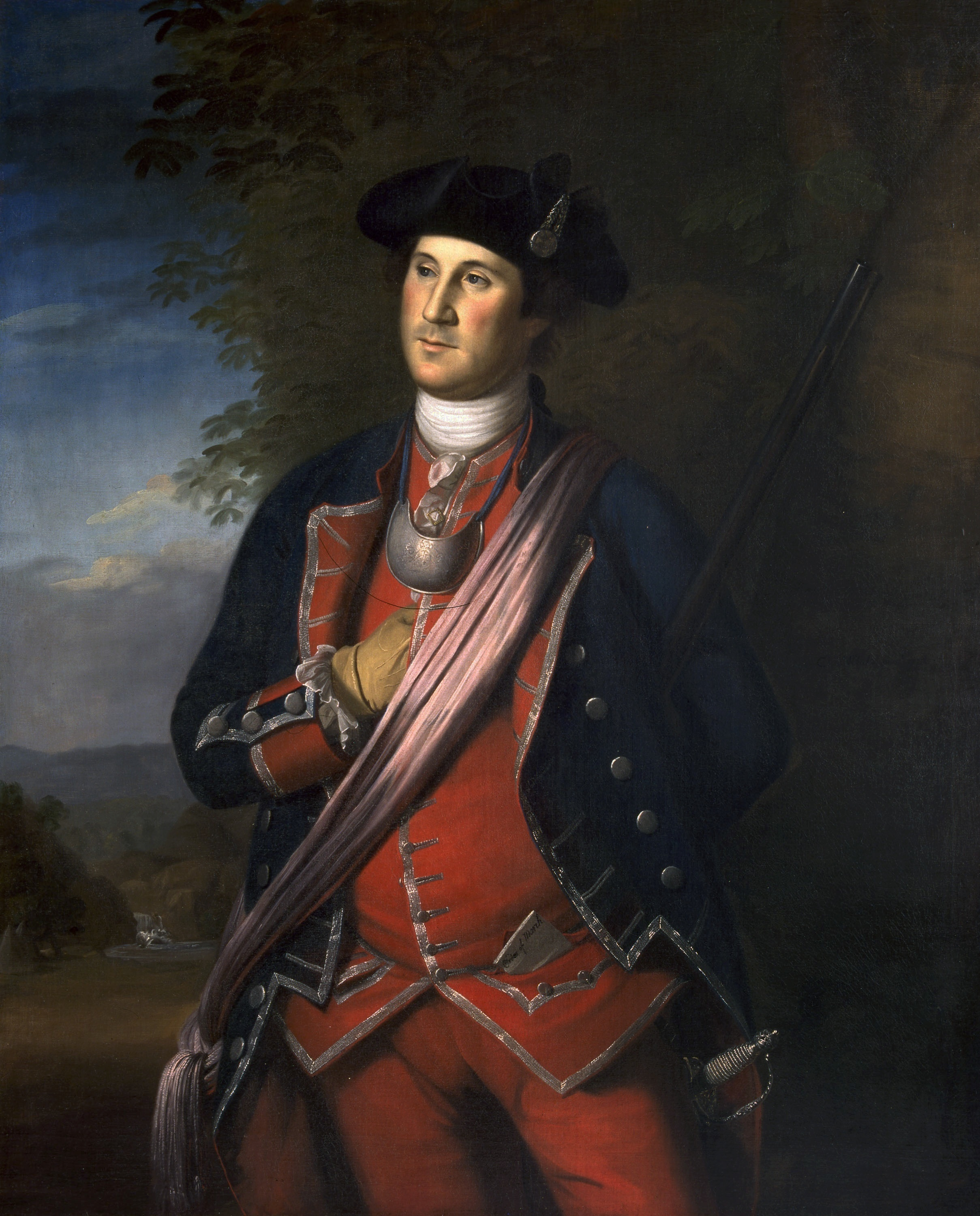
- This portrait of Washington was painted in 1772 by Charles Willson Peale, and shows Washington in uniform as a colonel of the Virginia Regiment. The original hangs in Lee Chapel at Washington and Lee University in Lexington, Virginia. It is his earliest known depiction.
- Born: February 22, 1732; Westmoreland County, Colony of Virginia
- Died: December 14, 1799 (aged 67); Mount Vernon, Virginia
- Burial place: Washington family vault, Mount Vernon
- Military career
- Branch: Virginia militia Virginia Provincial Forces
- Service years: 1753–1758
- Rank: Colonel
- Commands: Virginia Regiment
- Conflicts: French and Indian War Battle of Jumonville Glen Battle of Fort Necessity Braddock Expedition Battle of the Monongahela Forbes Expedition
- Other work: Commander-in-chief, Continental Army; President of the United States of America

George Washington's military experience began just prior to the French and Indian War when the governor of Virginia Robert Dinwiddie commissioned him as a major in the Virginia militia. Following this, Washington was sent in the same year as an envoy of the British Crown to French colonial authorities and Native Americans as far north as present-day Erie, Pennsylvania. In 1754 he led another expedition to the area to assist in the construction of a fort at present-day Pittsburgh. Before reaching that point, Washington and some of his men, along with British-allied Mingo led by Tanacharison, ambushed a French scouting party. The scouting party's commander was killed, although the exact circumstances of his death were disputed. This peacetime act of aggression is seen as one of the inciting incidents of the Seven Years' War. The French responded by attacking fortifications Washington erected following the ambush, forcing his surrender. Released on parole, Washington and his troops returned to Virginia.

In 1755, Washington participated as a volunteer aide in the ill-fated Braddock Expedition led by Major-general Edward Braddock, where he distinguished himself in the retreat following the Battle of the Monongahela. Washington served from 1755 until 1758 as colonel of the Virginia Regiment, directing the provincial defenses against French and Native Americans raids and building the regiment into one of the best-trained provincial regiments in the Thirteen Colonies. He led the regiment as part of the 1758 Forbes Expedition of Brigadier-general John Forbes that successfully drove the French from Fort Duquesne, during which he and some of his companies were involved in a friendly fire incident. Unable to get a commission in the British Army, Washington then resigned from his commissions, married, and took up the life of a Virginia plantation owner.

Washington gained valuable military skills during the war, acquiring tactical, strategic, and logistical military experience. He also acquired important political skills in his dealings with British military officers and colonial officials. Washington's military exploits, although they included some notable failures, made his military reputation in the colonies such that he became a natural selection as the commander-in-chief of the Continental Army following the outbreak of the American Revolutionary War in 1775. His successes in military and political spheres during that conflict led to his election as the first President of the United States in 1789.

== Background ==
Born into a prosperous colonial Virginia family in Bridges Creek near Fredericksburg in 1732 [O.S. 1731], George Washington was schooled locally until the age of 15. His father Augustine's sudden death occurred when Washington was just 11 years old. This eliminated the possibility of schooling in England, and his mother rejected attempts to place him in the Royal Navy. Thanks to the connection by marriage of his half-brother Lawrence to the wealthy Fairfax family, Washington was appointed as the surveyor of Culpeper County in 1749 when he was just 17 years old. Washington's brother had purchased an interest in the Ohio Company, a land acquisition and settlement company whose objective was the settlement of Virginia's frontier areas, including the Ohio Country, territory north and west of the Ohio River. Its investors also included the governor of Virginia Robert Dinwiddie, who appointed Washington as a major in the Virginia militia in February 1753.

== Emissary ==
The Ohio Country was inhabited by several Native American peoples that were nominally under the political control of the Haudenosaunee based in what is now northwestern New York. The area was also the subject of several conflicting claims by British and French colonies. The British colonies of Virginia and Pennsylvania both claimed the area, and traders from Pennsylvania had been trading with local Native Americans at least since the early 1740s. In 1752, representatives of the Ohio Company reached an agreement with local Native American leaders allowing the construction of a fort and a tiny settlement at the confluence of the Allegheny and Monongahela Rivers (present-day Pittsburgh, Pennsylvania), and for the establishment of some settlements south of the Ohio River. The French were alarmed by these developments, and in 1753 began the construction of a series of fortifications in the uppermost headwaters of the Ohio River (near present-day Erie, Pennsylvania), intending to extend the line of forts downriver and deny British traders and settlers access to the territory. When news of this reached Virginia, Governor Dinwiddie sought advice from the British government in London. He received orders to send a messenger to the French, reiterating British claims and demanding that they stop construction of their forts and quit the territory.

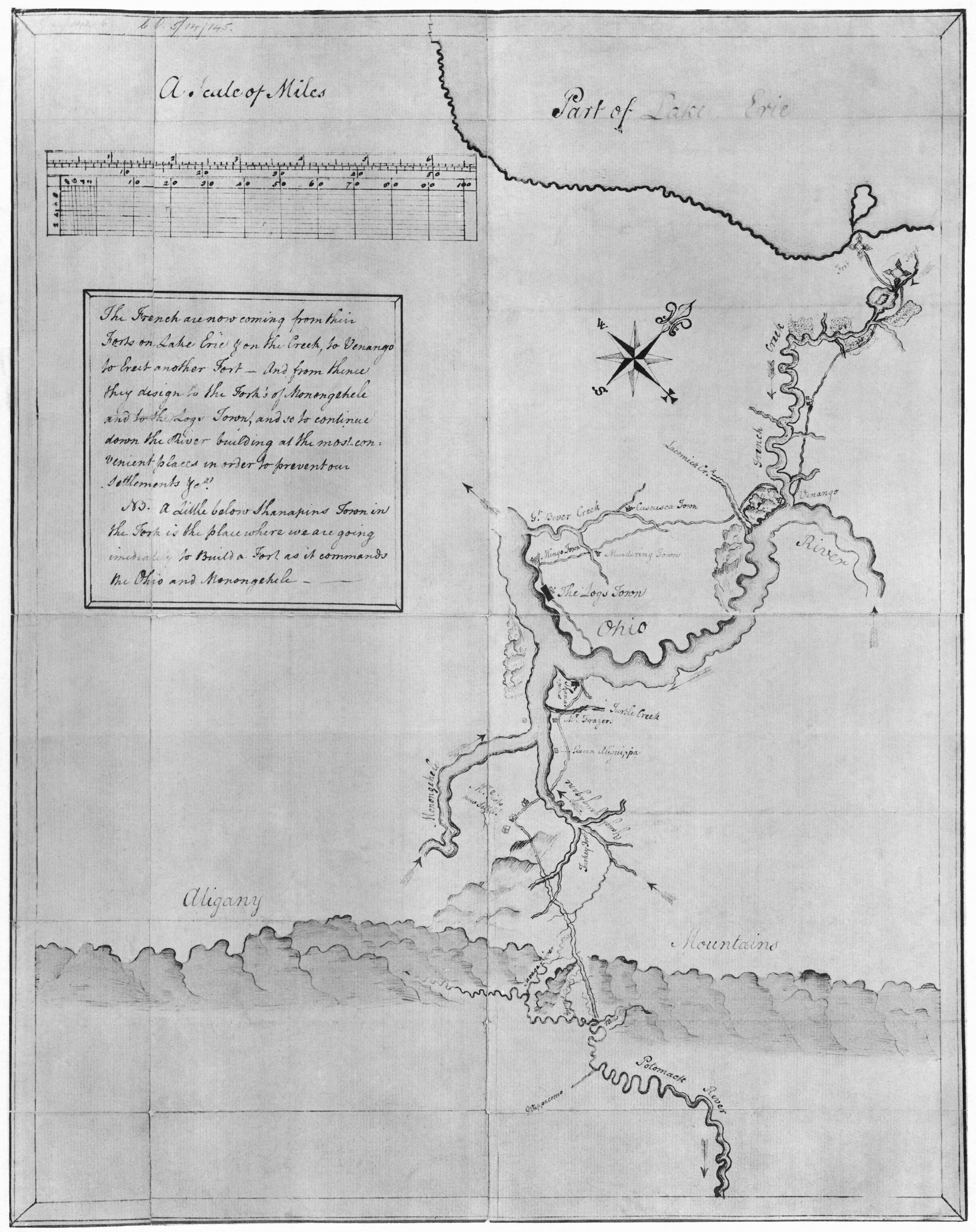
A map of the upper Ohio River and surrounding area drawn by Washington during or after his 1753 expedition

Governor Dinwiddie chose Major Washington, then 21 years old, for the trek into the Ohio Country to assess the French military situation, and to deliver the British demands. He was a good choice despite his youth because he was familiar with the frontier from survey work, had good health, and both government and Ohio Company leaders trusted Washington. Although he had no frontier warfare experience, neither did most other Virginians. Washington departed from Williamsburg at the end of October 1753. In Fredericksburg, he picked up Jacob Van Braam, a family friend who spoke French, before heading into the Virginia highlands. There he was joined by Christopher Gist, an Ohio Company agent who was familiar with the territory, and a few backwoodsmen to assist with expedition logistics. When the expedition arrived at the site of the proposed fort, Washington noted that the site was well chosen, having "the entire Command of the Monongahela".

The expedition then proceeded on to Logstown, a large Indian settlement a short way down the Ohio River. After parleying with the settlement's inhabitants, the Mingo "Half King" Tanacharison and three of his men agreed to accompany the British expedition to meet with the French. Washington also learned that many of the Ohio tribes were as unhappy about the British plans for settling the area as they were about the French plans to fortify it. Leaving Logstown on November 30, they arrived at Fort Machault on December 4. The commander there, Captain Philippe-Thomas de Joncaire, directed Washington to his superior officer, stationed at Fort LeBoeuf, further north. While dining with Joncaire, Washington learned of French intentions to "take possession of the Ohio".

Washington's party reached Fort LeBoeuf on December 11, in the middle of a raging snowstorm. The French commander, Captain Jacques Legardeur de Saint-Pierre, received them with hospitality; however, in response to Dinwiddie's demands, he pointed out that the letter was more properly addressed to his superior, the governor of New France Michel-Ange Duquesne de Menneville. The letter Legardeur drafted in response to Dinwiddie's was clear and to the point: "as to the summons you send me to retire, I do not think myself obliged to obey it." Washington took careful notes of the military arrangements at both forts before departing on December 16. He was somewhat concerned by the fact that Tanacharison and his men remained behind for further discussions with the French; he wrote, "I saw that every stratagem which the most fruitful brain could invent, was practiced to win Half King to their interest". He returned to Williamsburg after a month of difficult travel. Dinwiddie had Washington's account of the expedition widely distributed to emphasize the French threat. It was printed on both sides of the Atlantic, giving Washington an international reputation.

== Jumonville and Fort Necessity ==
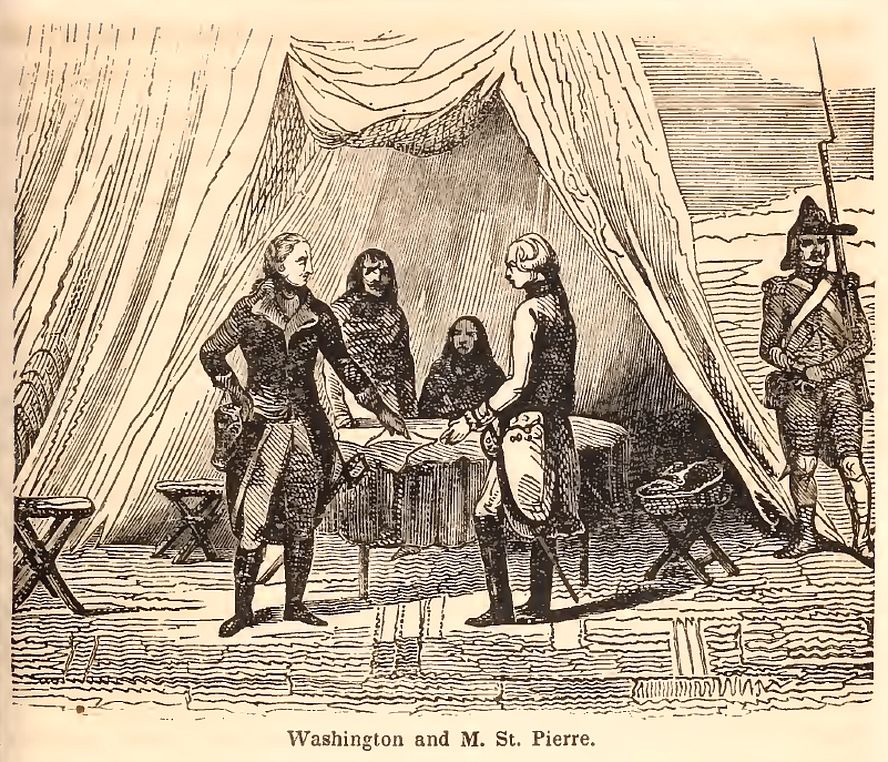
George Washington (left) meeting with French military commander Jacques Legardeur de Saint-Pierre in 1753

While Washington was returning from this expedition, Dinwiddie sent men from the Ohio Company (who were also commissioned into the provincial militia) under William Trent to begin construction of the company's fort. In February, with Tanacharison's blessing, Trent and his men began construction of the fort at the confluence of the Allegheny and Monongahela Rivers. Legardeur's successor at Venango, Claude-Pierre Pécaudy de Contrecœur, led a force of about 500 Canadians and Native Americans (rumors reaching Trent's men put its size at 1,000) to dislodge them. On April 16, they arrived at the forks; the next day, Trent's force of 36 men, led by Ensign Edward Ward in Trent's absence, agreed to leave the site, over the vociferous objections of Tanacharison. The French then began construction of Fort Duquesne.

Washington, upon his return to Williamsburg, was commissioned a Lieutenant Colonel in the newly created Virginia Regiment, and ordered by Dinwiddie to raise a force to assist in the completion of Trent's fort. Dinwiddie's orders were to "act on the [defensive], but in Case any Attempts are made to obstruct the Works or interrupt our [settlements] by any Persons whatsoever, You are to restrain all such Offenders, & in Case of resistance to make Prisoners of or kill and destroy them." Historian Fred Anderson describes Dinwiddie's instructions, which were issued without the knowledge or direction of the British government, as "an invitation to start a war." Washington was ordered to gather up as many supplies and paid volunteers as he could along the way. By the time he left for the frontier on April 2, he had recruited fewer than 160 men. Moving quickly and without artillery, his force marched north and west, picking up additional militia companies along the way. On April 19, outside Winchester, Virginia, Washington received word that a large French force was descending the Allegheny. On reaching Wills Creek he met part of Trent's company, who, in addition to confirming the arrival of the French, brought a supportive message from Tanacharison. To keep Tanacharison's support, Washington decided to advance rather than turning back. However, road-building went slowly, and by the end of May Washington's company had reached a place known as the Great Meadows (now in Fayette County, Pennsylvania), about 37 miles (60 km) south of the forks. There he began construction of a small fort and awaited further news or instructions.

On May 23, Contrecœur, now in command at Fort Duquesne, sent Joseph Coulon de Villiers de Jumonville with 35 Canadiens to see if Washington had entered French territory, and with a summons to order Washington's troops out; this summons was similar in nature to the one Washington had delivered to them in 1753. On May 27, Washington was told by Christopher Gist that a French party numbering about 50 was in the area. In response, Washington sent 75 men with Gist to find them. That evening, Washington received a message from Tanacharison, informing him that he had found the Canadien camp and that the two of them should meet. Although he had just sent another group in pursuit of the French, Washington went with a detachment of 40 men to meet with Tanacharison. The Mingo leader had with him 12 warriors, two of whom were boys. After discussing the matter, the two leaders agreed to attack the Canadiens.

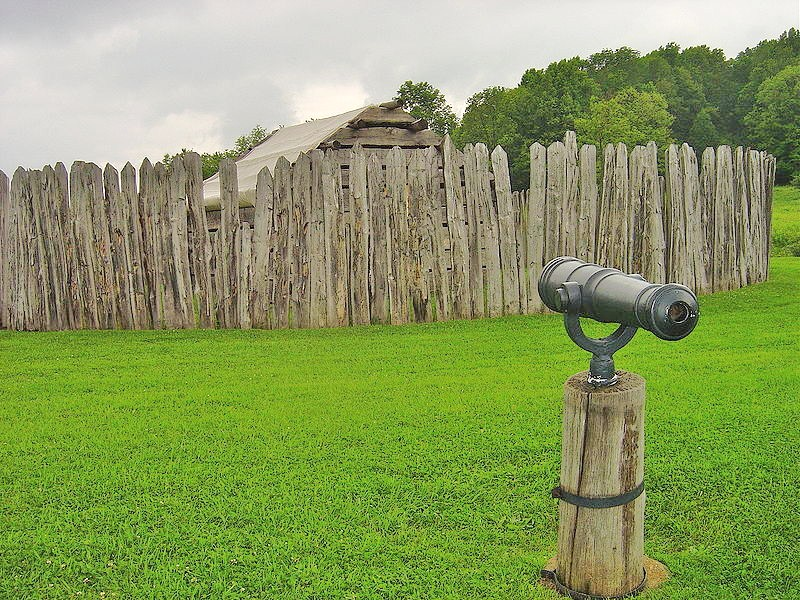
A recreation of Fort Necessity

Washington and Tanacharison then ambushed Jumonville's party, sneaking up and surrounding the French camp. Some were still asleep, others preparing breakfast when without warning, Washington gave the order to fire. Those who escaped the volley scrambled for their weapons but were swiftly overwhelmed. Ten of the French, including Jumonville, were killed, one was wounded, and all but one (who escaped to warn the French commander at Fort Duquesne) of the rest were taken, prisoner.

The exact circumstances of Jumonville's death are disputed. Contrecœur claimed that Jumonville and most of the other wounded French were massacred in cold blood by British musket fire after having surrendered; Washington claimed in his account that Jumonville was killed, but did not give any details. Other accounts claimed that Tanacharison tomahawked Jumonville while he (Jumonville) was reading the summons. When the British left the battlefield to return to their camp at Great Meadows, they did not bury any of the French dead.

Washington then finished building Fort Necessity at the Great Meadows, anticipating a French counterattack. The fort, completed June 2, was not much more than a wooden stockade 7 feet (2.1 m) high and about 50 feet (15 m) in diameter surrounded by a ditch. It was so poorly sited (surrounded by higher hills and woods providing cover to the enemy) that Tanacharison tried to point out its defects. Washington dismissed these concerns, convinced the fort could withstand "the attack of 500 Indians." Over the next month, his force grew by 200 men from Virginia and an independent company of 100 British regulars that had marched up from South Carolina, while he continued to build the road toward the forks. The arriving Virginians brought congratulations from Governor Dinwiddie on his success at Jumonville Glen, and word that Washington had been promoted to colonel, owing to the death of Colonel Joshua Fry in a fall from his horse.

While the road-building went on, Washington pressed Tanacharison for more Indian support. However, the Half King seemed to have lost confidence in the British cause, and he and his followers soon abandoned the British camp. This complete loss of Indian support prompted Washington to withdraw his work crews back to Fort Necessity. Not long afterward, a force of 700 French troops and Native American warriors surrounded the fort, and Washington was soon compelled to surrender. The surrender document that Washington signed prevented his men from returning to the Ohio Country for one year, and included an admission that Jumonville had been "assassinated". (The document was written in French, which Washington could not read, and may have been poorly translated for him.) Because the French claimed that Jumonville's party had been on a diplomatic (rather than military) mission, the "Jumonville affair" became an international incident, and the military escalation that followed blossomed into the global Seven Years' War. Although most Virginians were not particularly critical, there was rumbling about Washington's actions in other quarters. One New Yorker wrote that Washington acted rashly and that he was "too ambitious of acquiring all the honor", while London commentators dismissed the failure casually, citing a lack of colonial military experience. Governor Dinwiddie was publicly supportive of Washington, but criticized him privately, noting that some of the Virginia Regiment's problems originated in a "want of proper Command". Dinwiddie assigned command of a follow-up expedition (that never actually reached the Ohio Country) to North Carolina militia colonel James Innes. In another step that may have been calculated to clip the young colonel's wings, Dinwiddie reorganized the Virginia Regiment into separate companies, with no ranks above captain; Washington resigned rather than accept a demotion.

== Braddock's Defeat ==
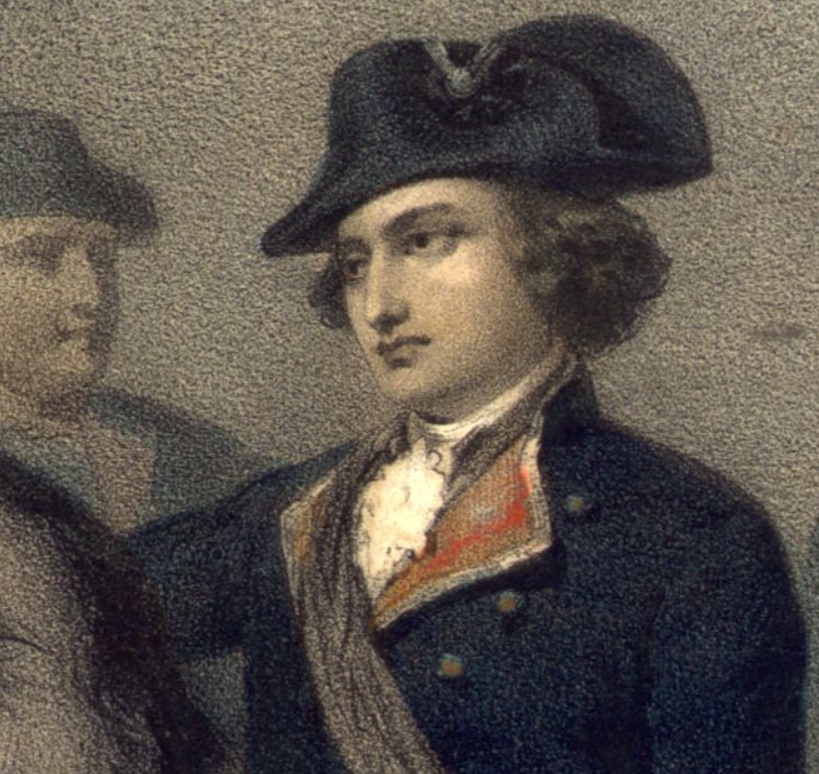
Cropped posthumous portrait of George Washington during the Battle of the Monongahela

In 1755, as part of the British military escalation, Major General Edward Braddock arrived in North America with a force of British Army regulars to head a major effort against the French in the Ohio Country. Washington wanted to serve on the expedition, but refused to do so as a provincial officer since he would be outranked by even junior officers in the regular army establishment. (Washington was said to "[bubble] with fury when British regular officers expressed their disdain of provincial officers and soldiers", and at the realization that British officers were always senior to colonials regardless of rank.) Through negotiations mediated by Governor Dinwiddie, Washington was offered an unpaid volunteer position as one of Braddock's aides. Washington accepted, writing to Braddock's principal aide, Captain Robert Orme, "I wish for nothing more earnestly, than to attain a small degree of knowledge in the Military Art", and that the position would provide him "a good opportunity ... of forming an acquaintance which may be serviceable hereafter, if I can find it worth while pushing my Fortune in the Military way."

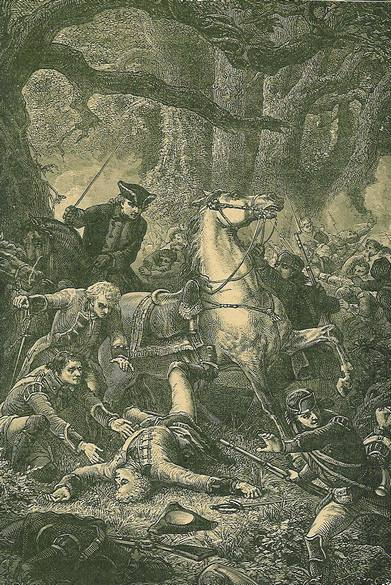
Major-General Braddock's death at the Battle of the Monongahela, July 9, 1755.

When Braddock's regulars arrived in Alexandria, Washington spent much time there, observing infantry drills and other internal workings of the army, and even copied Braddock's orders to absorb the style in which they were written. The expedition finally marched off in April 1755, and made extremely slow progress along the road Washington had cut in 1754, owing to the heavy artillery and long baggage train. Braddock and his entourage arrived at Fort Cumberland on May 10. From there the progress slowed even further as the army made its way to the Monongahela River. Washington fell ill with dysentery en route, and only rejoined the column on July 8, when it was nearing the Monongahela.

The next day, after Lieutenant Colonel Thomas Gage's light infantry had crossed the Monongahela about 10 miles (16 km) from Fort Duquesne, they stumbled into a French and Indian force that had been sent to locate them. Both sides were surprised, but the French and Native Americans quickly organized themselves and made a vicious onslaught against the British. Gage's men, and the work crews they were guarding, turned and fled in a panic, right into the arriving column of regulars, which included Braddock and his entourage. The discipline of the British regulars broke down, and a panicked retreat began, with the French and Native Americans firing at them from the cover of the surrounding woods. Braddock lost several horses, and eventually went down with a mortal wound. Washington was one of the few of Braddock's aides to emerge relatively unscathed, despite being significantly involved in the fighting. He had two horses shot out from under him, four bullets pierced his coat, and fragments of shrapnel were later discovered in his hair. He sustained no injuries and showed coolness under fire. Braddock, who had been loaded onto a wagon in a makeshift litter, ordered Washington to ride back to fetch the remainder of the army that was working its way up from the Great Meadows. The battered remnants of Braddock's force eventually returned to Fort Cumberland, where Washington wrote letters harshly critical of the event. To Governor Dinwiddie, he reported that, although the British officers fought well, their "cowardly Dogs of soldiers" did not. The Virginians, he said, acquitted themselves well: they "behaved like Men, and died like Soldiers." His reports burnished the reputation of the Virginia Regiment, and Washington was lauded as the "hero of Monongahela" for his work organizing the retreat. Dinwiddie was also forced to acknowledge Washington's "gallant Behav[io]r", and the Virginia House of Burgesses reorganized the colony's defenses with Washington as colonel of a 1,200 strong regiment.

Fifteen years later, in 1770, Washington returned to the same Pennsylvania wilderness. Upon hearing of his arrival, an old Indian chief traveled a long way just to meet him. Sitting down with Washington, the chief revealed that he had been a leader in the battle years before. He recounted how he had personally fired at Washington 17 times without success, concluding that the young officer was protected by the Great Spirit. He then ordered his warriors to cease firing at him. The chief told Washington: "I have traveled a long and weary path that I might see the young warrior of the great battle… I am come to pay homage to the man who is the particular favorite of Heaven, and who can never die in battle."

Red Hawk, another Native American chief who fought in the same battle, later claimed to have fired at Washington 11 times without striking him. Convinced that the Great Spirit was shielding him, he too ceased firing.

== Command, rank, and defense ==
Governor Dinwiddie had designated Fort Cumberland the regimental headquarters, even though it was located in Maryland. Washington learned that it was commanded by Captain John Dagworthy, who led a company of Maryland militia but also held a royal commission and would thus outrank him. After a brief visit to Fort Cumberland in September 1755, Washington left, and chose to base himself at Winchester instead. He then embarked on recruiting expeditions to fill out the regiment, traveling often to Williamsburg. There, he complained bitterly to Dinwiddie about serving under Dagworthy. When Dagworthy refused to let the Virginians draw supplies from Fort Cumberland (which, despite its location, had been paid for and provisioned by Virginia), Dinwiddie came to agree with Washington. He wrote to Massachusetts Governor William Shirley, who was acting as commander in chief after Braddock's death, requesting royal commissions for Washington and other Virginia officers. When Shirley did not respond in a timely manner, Dinwiddie authorized Washington to travel to Boston to renew the request in person. Washington spent some time visiting all of the major towns on the way, (Note: Including Dedham.) but his mission was ultimately only partially successful. After receiving Washington, Shirley issued a decree that Virginia's officers outranked Dagworthy and other British officers of lower rank.

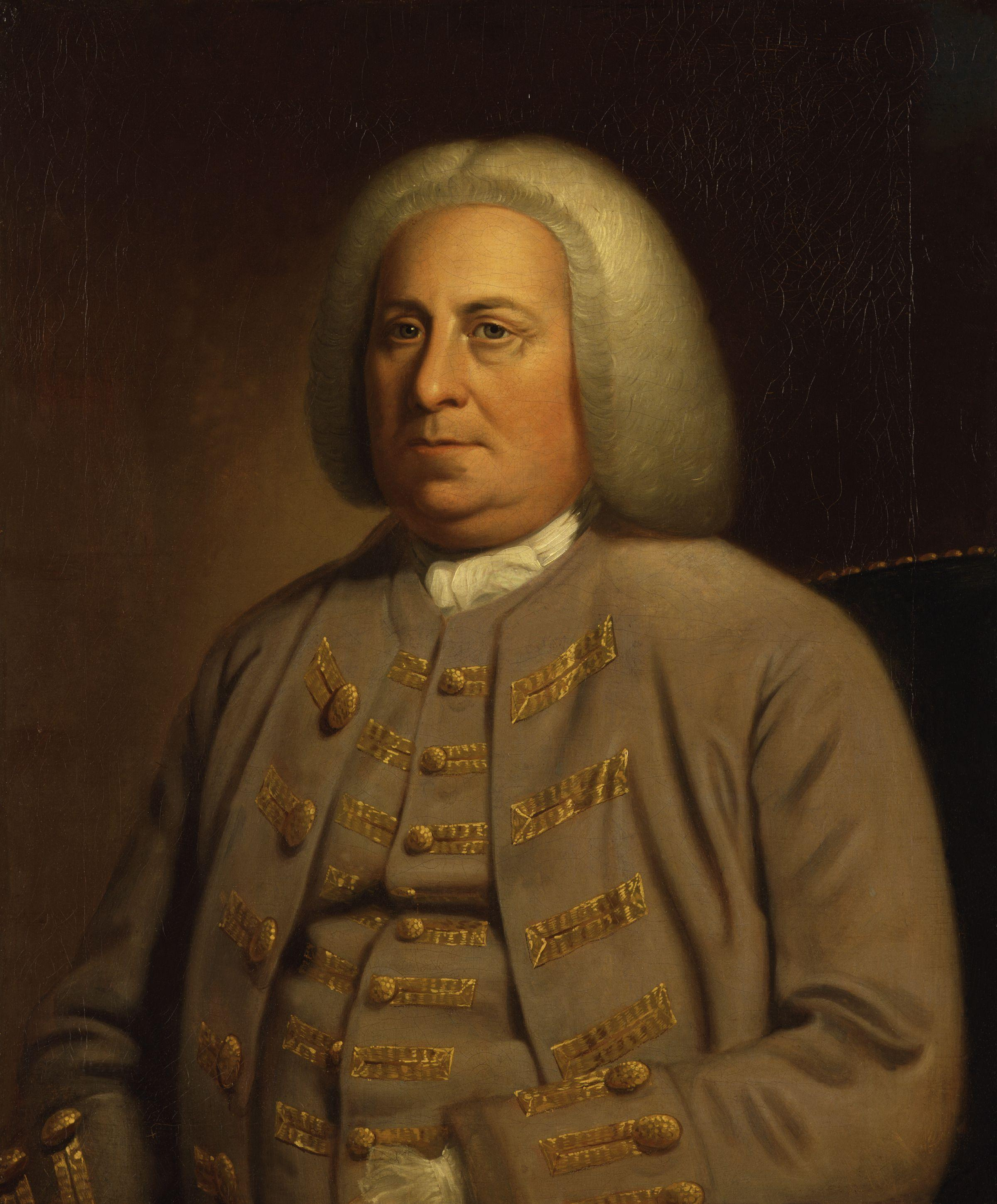
Washington had a sometimes difficult relationship with Virginia Governor Robert Dinwiddie

In his first year in command of the Virginia Regiment, Washington shaped the unit into one of the best provincial military units in the colonies. He rigorously enforced military discipline, often punishing transgressions with the lash, but also sometimes hanging those convicted of serious offenses like desertion. The latter was a particular problem: many of the recruits were either foreigners or from Virginia's lower classes, and had little at stake in the conflict. He developed detailed guidelines for frontier warfare, was personally responsible for organizing the supply and equipment of the regiment, and even designed the regimental uniforms. He was also a voracious reader of military treatises of all sorts, from Julius Caesar's Commentaries to recent British training manuals. Despite all of his work, Virginia's frontier was ravaged by raiding parties, and he lost one third of his men in eighteen months. Washington's relationship with Dinwiddie deteriorated again over these difficulties and ongoing complaints about pay that was inadequate compared to British regimental standards.

In 1757, Washington renewed attempts to cultivate relations in the army in the hopes of getting a commission. He wrote flattering letters to the new commander in chief, the Earl of Loudoun, and even named one of Virginia's frontier forts after him. However, Loudoun was only in command for one year, and was recalled after a failed expedition against Fortress Louisbourg. Later in the year, Washington again suffered a serious bout of dysentery; he was bedridden for much of the winter of 1757–58, and even suggested to the Virginia Burgesses that he be replaced since he could not properly do his duty as colonel of the regiment.

== Forbes expedition ==
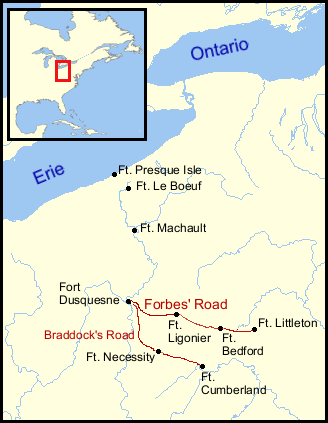
Map showing fort locations and the routes taken by Braddock and Forbes

The failures of British military policy in 1757 led to a change of government in London, with William Pitt coming firmly into control of Britain's global war effort. Pitt decided to focus a large number of resources on the war in North America, and three major expeditions were planned. One of these, under the command of Brigadier General John Forbes, was assigned to move against the French in the Ohio Country, with its first major goal the capture of Fort Duquesne. Forbes was to lead an army of 2,000 regulars augmented by 5,000 provincials raised from Pennsylvania southward.

=== Diplomacy and military politics ===
The Virginia Burgesses voted to raise a second regiment of 1,000 men in addition to Washington's, both of which would participate in the Forbes expedition under Washington's overall command. Forbes was apparently already aware of Washington's reputation, writing that he was "a good and knowing Officer in the Back Country." Washington, as he had with other army commanders, hoped for notice and sponsorship, and asked General John Stanwix to "[m]ention me in favorable terms to General Forbes." Forbes ordered the Virginia troops to gather at Winchester while the army began cutting a new road from Carlisle, Pennsylvania toward Fort Duquesne. Based in part on advice from Washington, Forbes spent much of the spring and summer negotiating with the Native Americans of the Ohio Country for their support. A preliminary agreement was reached in August in which many of those Native Americans, led by chief Teedyuscung, agreed to abandon their alliance with the French. Washington and his troops were first given the task of improving the road between Fort Frederick and Fort Cumberland, and did not join with the main army at Fort Bedford until late summer.

At this point Forbes was faced with a choice of routes. He could cut a new road directly across western Pennsylvania, or he could go south and pick up Braddock's route. Washington extensively lobbied Forbes and other British officers to use Braddock's route, which would have been more advantageous to Virginia interests. Forbes and others took a dim view of this activity, suspecting personal and provincial financial motivation. In response to a letter in which Washington bemoaned "our Enterprize [is] Ruind", and blamed Colonel Henry Bouquet for his advocacy of the Pennsylvania route, Forbes angrily wrote, "I am now at the bottom, of their Scheme against this new road" and chastised Washington, writing that his heavy-handed advocacy "was a shame for any officer to be Concerned in." Forbes ultimately chose the Pennsylvania route for pragmatic military reasons: the army, was expected to occupy and hold Fort Duquesne, and would require a reliable supply route, and the Pennsylvania route was superior for this purpose. However, as the expedition pushed west and Forbes learned that the last ridge to cross would prove particularly difficult, he granted that Washington and other advocates of the Virginia route may have been correct in their assessment of the chosen route's problems.

=== Advance on Fort Duquesne ===
In early September, troops under Henry Bouquet's command began construction of a fort near present-day Loyalhanna Township that eventually came to be known as Fort Ligonier. Bouquet was handling the forward activities of the expedition because Forbes was sick with dysentery. On September 11, Bouquet authorized Major James Grant to lead a reconnaissance in force to investigate the strength of Fort Duquesne's defenses. Grant took this opportunity to launch an assault on the fort, and was decisively beaten and taken prisoner along with one third of his 800-strong detachment. Although Washington was not involved, men from his regiment acquitted themselves well in the debacle; 62 of them died in the battle, and others were among the prisoners. The French at Fort Duquesne, whose supply line had been cut by the British victory in the August Battle of Fort Frontenac, made an unsuccessful attack against Fort Ligonier in the hopes of either stopping the expedition or at least acquiring some of its supplies.

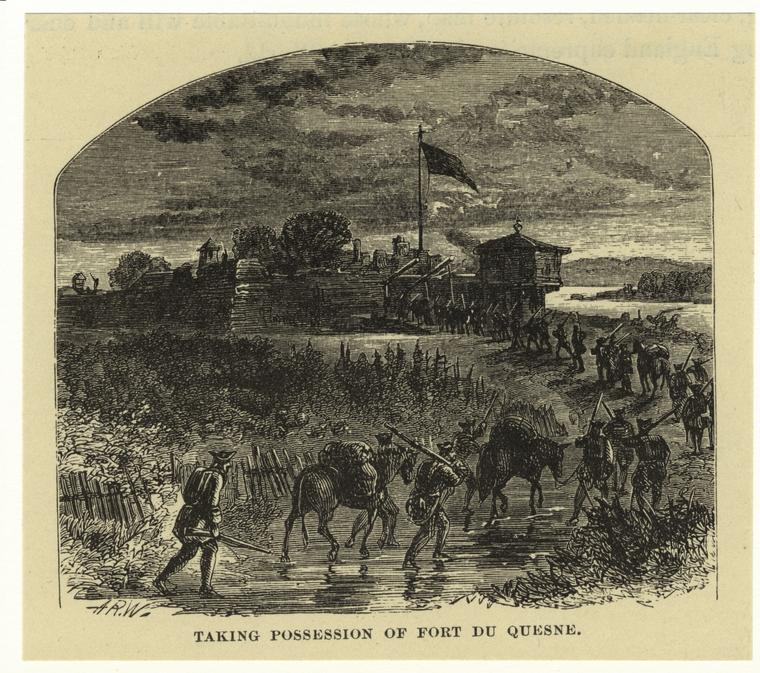
British troops take possession of Fort Duquesne

On November 12, in response to rumors that the French had sent out a raiding force, Forbes sent out a detachment of the Virginia regiment to investigate reports of a French raiding expedition. When sounds of gunfire reached the British camp, Forbes sent a second detachment. Primary sources are unclear on which detachment Washington led; the other was led by Lieutenant Colonel George Mercer. In the dimming light of early evening and the haze of musket smoke the two detachments mistook each other for the enemy; the friendly fire incident resulted in 40 casualties. Washington claimed to have interceded, "knocking up with his sword the presented pieces", but Captain Thomas Bullitt, the only other officer to leave an account, held Washington responsible for the incident, noting that his opinion was shared by "several of the officers." The incident appeared to leave an emotional scar on Washington, who did not speak or write of it for many years.

A beneficial result of the incident was that several prisoners were taken; Forbes learned from them that Fort Duquesne was about to be abandoned. This prompted Forbes to accelerate the expedition's advance, and it was soon in a position of strength about 10 miles (16 km) from Fort Duquesne. On November 23 they heard a large explosion from the direction of the fort; its commander, François-Marie Le Marchand de Lignery, had blown it up. Forbes assigned Washington command of one of the brigades that advanced to find the smoking remains of the French fort the next day. General Forbes, still weak from illness, only briefly visited the site. He completed the return trip to Philadelphia in a litter, and died in March 1759. Washington was back home in Virginia by the end of December; the expedition was his last military activity of the war.

== End of service ==
Upon his return to Williamsburg, Washington, to the surprise of many, tendered his resignation from the Virginia militia. Many of his officers showered him with praise, including the critical Captain Thomas Bullitt. Washington was lauded for his "punctual Obervance" of his duties, the "Frankness, Sincerity, and a certain Openness of Soul", and the "mutual Regard that has always subsisted between you and your Officers." Biographer James Ferling characterizes as their highest tribute the statements that Washington "heightened our natural Emulation, and our Desire to excel" and "In you we place the most implicit confidence."

== Lessons learned ==
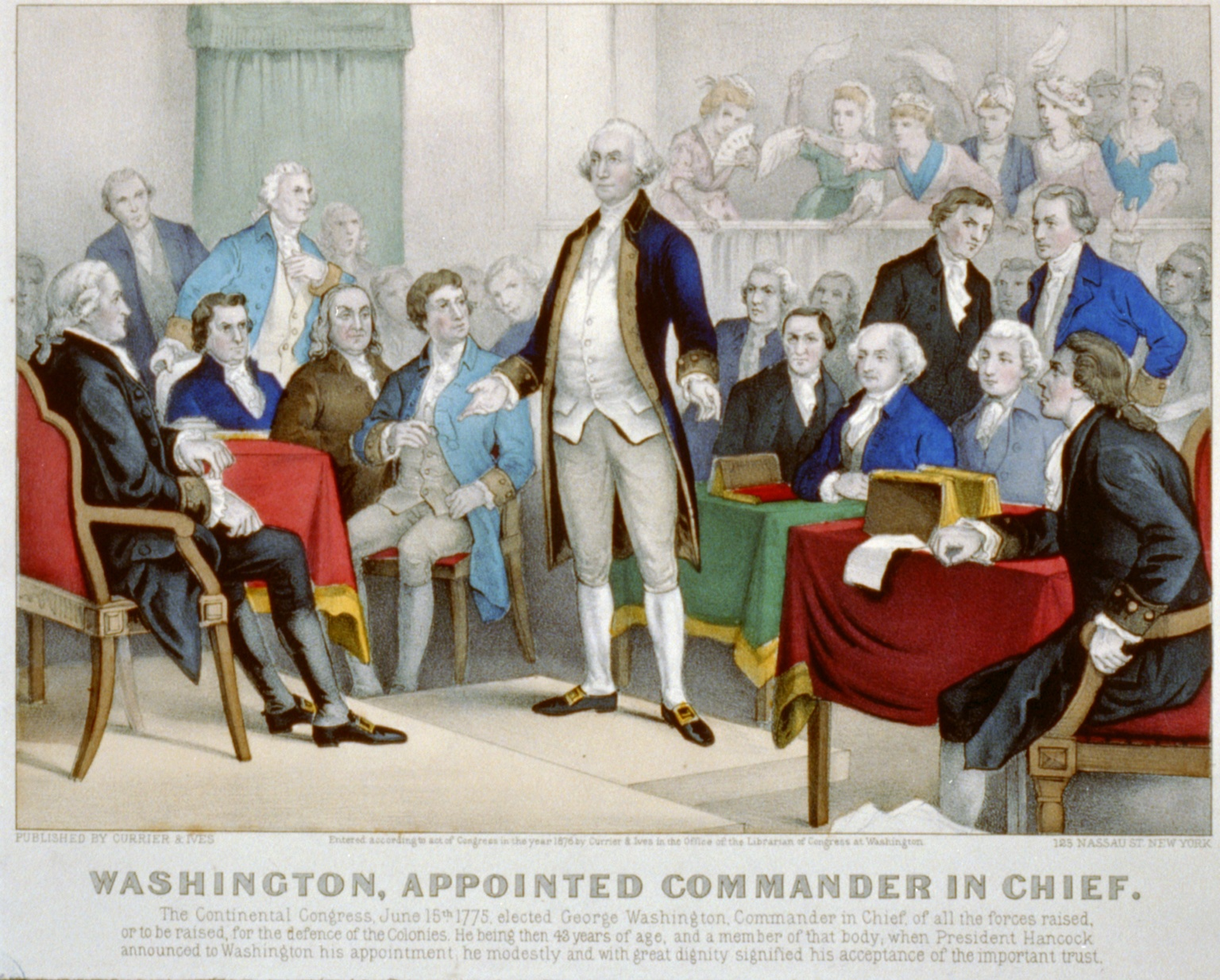
Currier and Ives lithograph depicting Washington's appointment as commander in chief of the Continental Army in 1775

Although Washington never gained the commission in the British army he yearned for, in these years the young man gained valuable military, political, and leadership skills, and received significant public exposure in the colonies and abroad. He closely observed British military tactics, gaining a keen insight into their strengths and weaknesses that proved invaluable during the Revolution. He demonstrated his toughness and courage in the most difficult situations, including disasters and retreats. He developed a command presence—given his size, strength, stamina, and bravery in battle, he appeared to soldiers to be a natural leader and they followed him without question.

Washington gained connections because of his popularity, which would serve him well later in the Revolution. His involvement in the war, given the circumstances, was just enough for him to be able to craft his own idea of what a leader looked like. Washington learned to organize, train, and drill, and discipline his companies and regiments. From his observations, readings and conversations with professional officers, he learned the basics of battlefield tactics, as well as a good understanding of problems of organization and logistics.

Historian Ron Chernow argues that his frustrations in dealing with government officials during this conflict led him to advocate the advantages of a strong national government and a vigorous executive agency that could get results; other historians tend to ascribe Washington's position on government to his later American Revolutionary War service. His dealings also gave him the diplomatic skills necessary to negotiate with officials at the local and provincial levels. He developed a very negative idea of the value of militia, who seemed too unreliable, too undisciplined, and too short-term compared to regulars. On the other hand, his experience was limited to command of about 1,000 men, and came only in remote frontier conditions that were far removed from the urban situations he faced during the revolution at Boston, New York, Trenton and Philadelphia.

== Later life ==
On January 6, 1759, Washington married Martha Dandridge Custis, a wealthy Virginia widow. He had already won election to the Virginia House of Burgesses during the summer of 1758. For the next 16 years he lived the life of a Virginia plantation owner and politician. As tensions rose between the British parliament and the colonies, he gradually adopted positions in opposition to the parliament's policies. When the American Revolutionary War broke out in April 1775, Washington arrived at the Second Continental Congress in a military uniform, and was chosen as Commander-in-chief of the Continental Army. After leading American forces to victory, he chaired the Constitutional Convention that drafted the United States Constitution, and was then elected the first President of the United States, serving two terms. He briefly saw additional military service during a threatened war with France in 1798, and died in December 1799. He is widely recognized as the "Father of his country".

== See also ==
- List of George Washington articles
- Great Britain in the Seven Years' War
- France in the Seven Years' War
- George Washington's relations with the Iroquois Confederacy
