= Mercer's Fort =

Temporary 18th century fort in colonial Pennsylvania

- Allegheny County, Pennsylvania (present day Pittsburgh, Pennsylvania)

Site information
- Type: Military fort

Location
- Location of Mercer's Fort in Pennsylvania
- Coordinates: 40°26′23″N 79°58′35″W

Site history
- Built: 1759
- In use: 1759–1760

Garrison information
- Past commanders: Captain Hugh Mercer; General John Stanwix
- Garrison: 280-720 troops, mixed militia and army

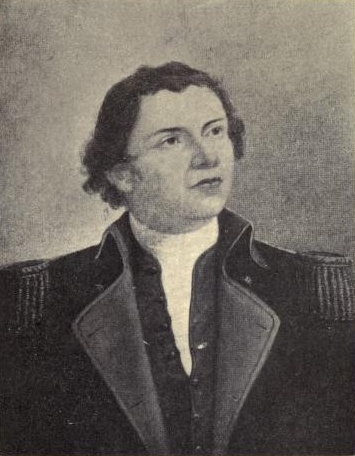
Colonel Hugh Mercer

Mercer's Fort was a temporary fort built by Colonel Hugh Mercer during the winter of 1758–1759, to secure the "forks of the Ohio," at the confluence of the Monongahela River and the Allegheny River, where Mercer was preparing to build Fort Pitt. At the time it was loosely known as "the fort at Pittsburgh," and when work on Fort Pitt had progressed, it was sometimes referred to as "the first Fort Pitt." Only later did people call it "Mercer's Fort," leading to confusion with Fort Mercer in New Jersey. The fort initially served to defend the site, but as Fort Pitt neared completion, it was used mostly to lodge workers and to store supplies. In mid-1760 it was partially dismantled, with some buildings converted into a hospital.

== Background ==
In January 1754 Major George Washington, returning from a meeting with the French commander at Fort Le Boeuf, observed the land at the confluence of the Allegheny River and the Ohio River, and felt it would be an ideal location for a fort, which would then serve to monitor river traffic heading west into the Ohio Country. As the French had already started building a chain of forts south of Lake Erie, it seemed likely that they would build a fort at this spot, therefore Governor James Hamilton attempted to get funding from the Pennsylvania Provincial Council for an English fort, without success. The Ohio Company of Virginia was willing to fund the fort's construction, however, and in February Virginia Governor Robert Dinwiddie sent William Trent and a small number of Virginia militia to start construction of what was later named Fort Prince George. By April, the land had been cleared and a storehouse built, but the French discovered the project and sent a large force of infantry and artillery to capture it. They built Fort Duquesne at the same site, and maintained control over Ohio River traffic until the Forbes Expedition threatened to take the fort. On November 24, 1758, the French burned Fort Duquesne and retreated. Within two weeks, Colonel Hugh Mercer had started construction on a temporary fort, to serve as lodging, storage and defense during the building of the much larger Fort Pitt.

== Construction ==
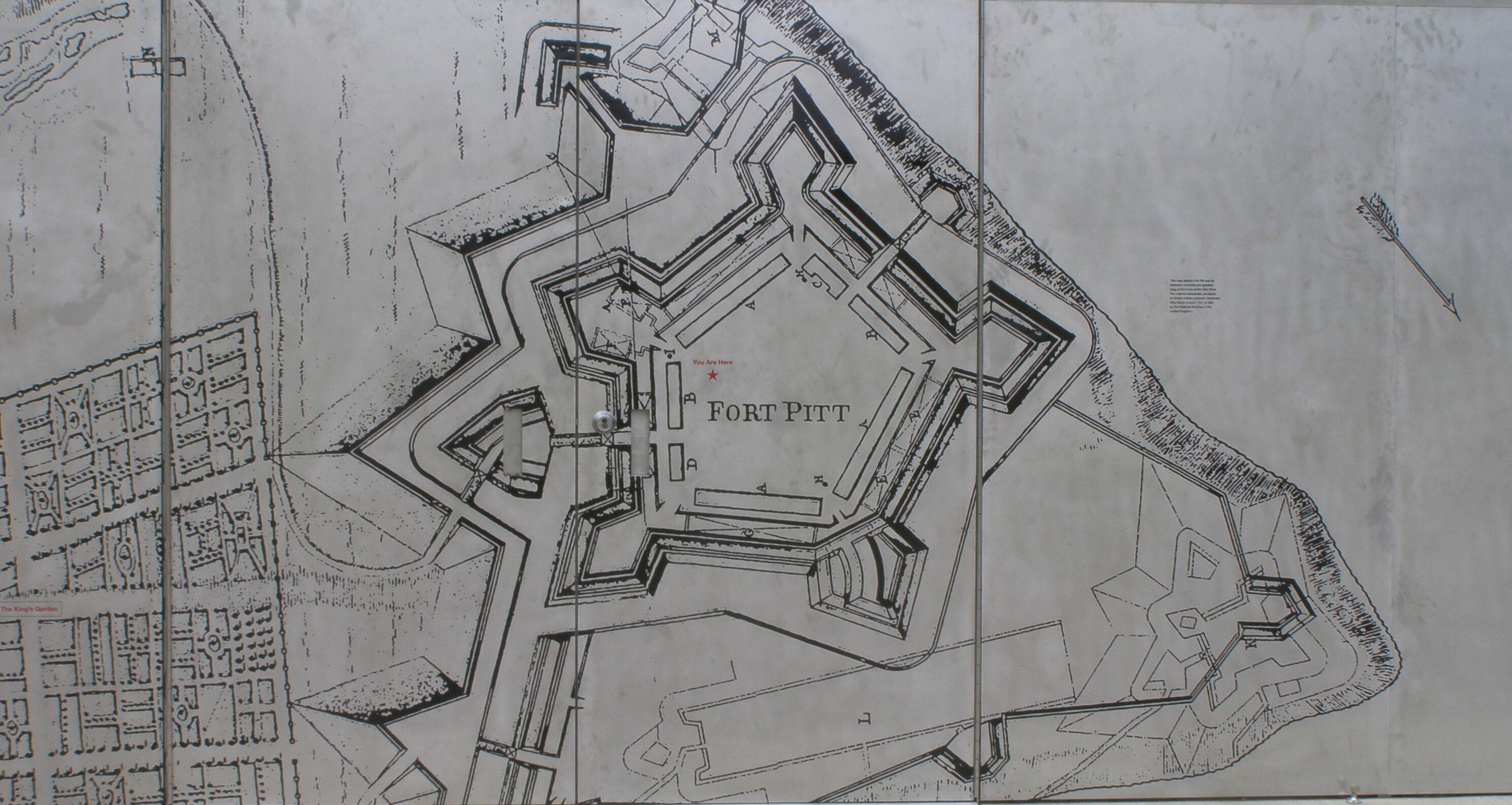
Plan of Fort Pitt, showing the outline of Mercer's Fort at the top of page, labelled "M".

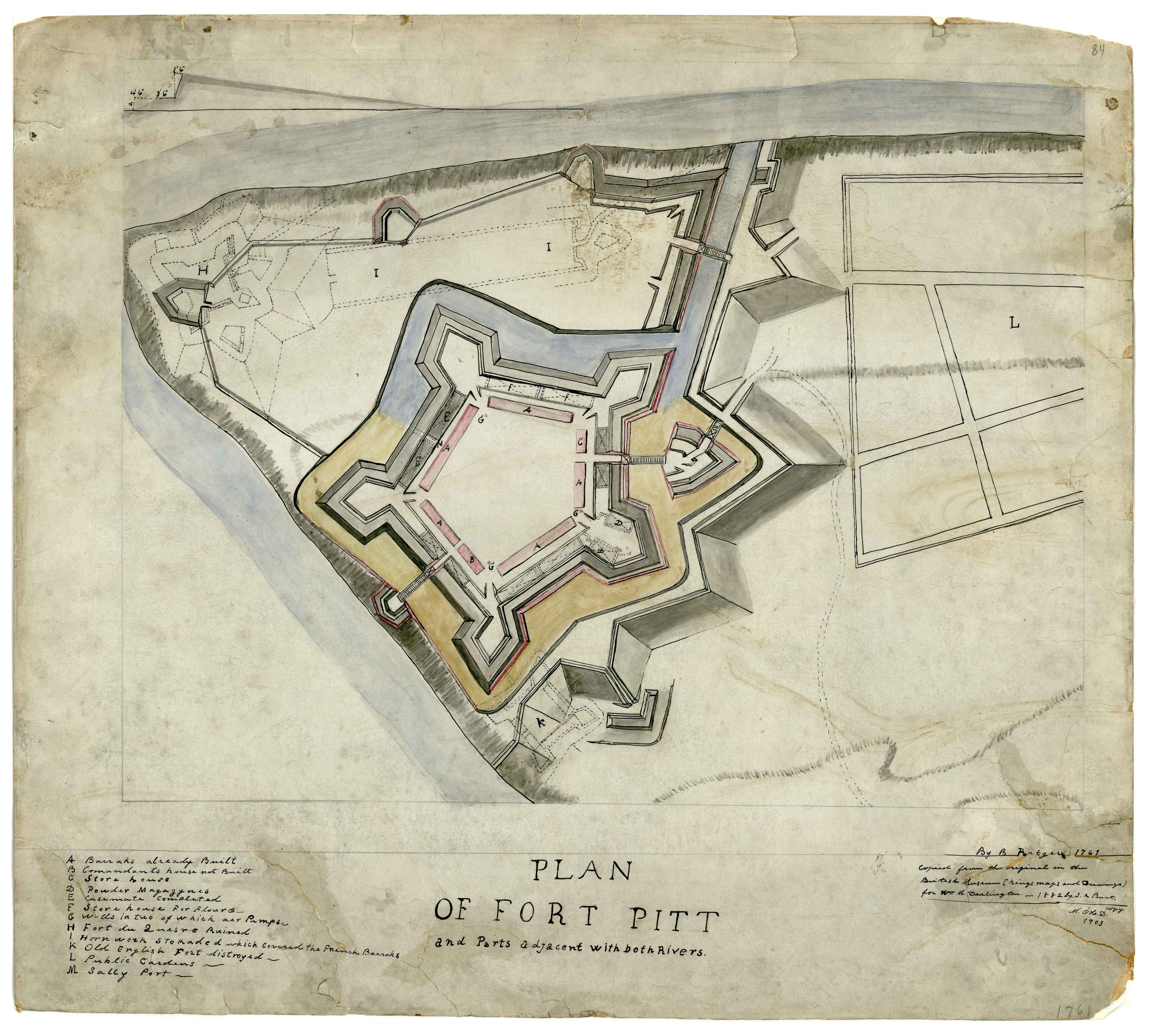
Plan of Fort Pitt showing the outline of Mercer's Fort at the bottom, labelled "K".

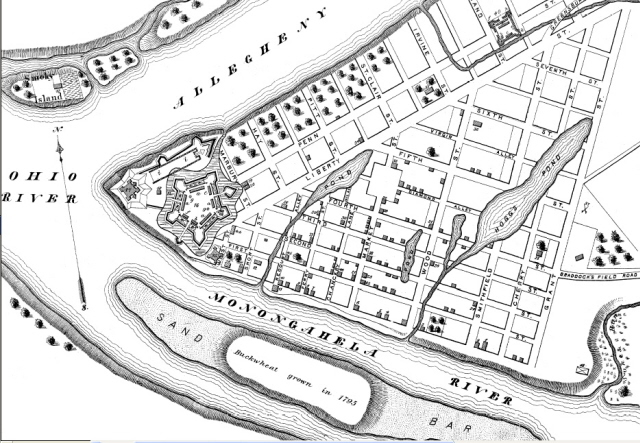
1795 map of Pittsburgh showing Mercer's Fort superimposed on West Street.

The temporary fortification was built just south of what later became the Flag Bastion, now located in Point State Park. It was located on the north bank of the Monongahela at the south end of what, later, was West street in the city of Pittsburgh, and between West street and Liberty Avenue, about 200 yards east of the ruins of Fort Duquesne. It was a small stockade with bastions, designed to accommodate a garrison of 200 men, built between December 1758 and early January 1759. It was intended only for temporary use, to defend against French or Native American attacks while the main fort was under construction. Colonel Hugh Mercer was placed in command, and the rest of the army marched back to the settlements.

Mercer's Fort was a square stockade with the walls formed by the backs of the interior buildings. Mercer chose not to build an outer wall, but instead constructed three barracks, the commandant's house, and a storeroom facing the gate, with four diamond-shaped bastions between them, at each corner. Smaller separate houses for the officers and the bombardiers were located in the northern bastions. The southern bastions held the gunpowder magazine and the hospital. The fort was purposely built on the Monongahela riverbank, so that the troops could escape by boat downriver in the event of an overwhelming assault.

Outside the fort Mercer had a "council house" built, for meetings with Native Americans, as he knew that maintaining good diplomatic relations with them was a key part of the fort's defense. This was the venue for a number of important conferences, the first of which took place on July 4, 1759, and included George Croghan, Colonel Mercer, William Trent, Andrew Montour, interpreter, Lenape chief King Beaver, and Seneca war leader Guyasuta.

Due to the severe cold, construction was painfully slow, as the frozen soil was difficult to dig and felled trees had to be dragged across the icebound river. On December 19, Mercer wrote to his commander, Colonel Henry Bouquet: "I expect in four Days to have the Place made capable of a tolerable Defence, and am fully determined to maintain the Post, or at least, make it as dear a Purchase to the Enemy as possible." Engineer Harry Gordon was sent to advise Mercer on construction. On January 3, Mercer wrote to Bouquet that "Nine Hundred and Fifty men may be contained in the Fort by building Barracks opposite the storehouses, and hutts might be raised in the front within the Intrenchments you have Directed to be made, to lodge 100 more." On January 19 Mercer wrote, "I am glad to have Mr. Gordon's Directions and shall conform to them...Another Row of Barracks are now raising, opposite the Stores." An additional row of barracks was built along the shore, to house the hundreds of men needed to construct the massive Fort Pitt.

In April 1759, General Henry Bouquet asked Mercer to relocate the fort to higher ground, and sent another British engineer James Robertson to assist him. The engineer recommended a hilltop in what is now Chartiers Township, Pennsylvania, which Mercer agreed was "strong, convenient, heathfull, and pleasant," but noted that they would need long chains "for drawing up water, wood, etc. either by Cranes or Windlasses."

== Garrison ==
On January 8, 1759, Colonel Mercer reported to Governor William Denny that he had a garrison of about 280 men, and that the "works" were capable of some defense. On March 17, 1759, the garrison totaled 428 men: 10 commissioned officers, 18 non-commissioned officers, 3 drummers, 346 rank and file, fit for duty, 79 sick, and three unaccounted for. Twelve had died since 1 January. Separate units included: Royal Artillery, 8; Royal Americans, 20; Highlanders, 80; Virginia Regiment, 99; First Pennsylvania Battalion, 136; Second Pennsylvania Battalion, 85. By December 1759, the garrison consisted of 300 Pennsylvania and Virginia militia and 400 Pennsylvania infantry, plus 21 officers.

== Military history ==
On March 25 1759, Colonel Mercer launched an assault on Fort Machault, the nearest French fort, which the French had been strengthening. Two hundred men marched on land while fifty men escorted ten bateaux of supplies on the river. The troops were slowed by heavy rains and a river swollen with snowmelt, however, and by March 28 they had advanced only twenty miles when Shawnee and Lenape warriors attacked them, killing the men in one boat and causing the other men on the river to turn back. The troops on land also retreated, and the assault was abandoned.

Mercer's Fort was never attacked, but in June 1759 Colonel Mercer learned that a French force of 700 troops, 800 Native American warriors, and some artillery was advancing from Fort Machault, intending to attack Mercer's Fort and Fort Ligonier. The French were only a day's march from Pittsburgh when the attack was aborted, as the French forces were diverted when British troops arrived to attack Fort Niagara, in what would become the Battle of Fort Niagara.

== Dismantling, 1760 ==
As fighting diminished towards the end of the French and Indian War, Mercer's Fort was used less for defense and more as housing for workers and to store supplies until mid-1760, when work on Fort Pitt had progressed to the point where the older fort was no longer necessary. It was dismantled, with the wood recycled for use in other construction. In October 1762, Indian trader James Kenny noted the changes as the older outbuildings were razed or converted: "Where two years ago I had seen all ye Houses that were without ye Little Fort they had then, thrown down, only one [the Indian conference house] which stands yet, also two that was within that little fort...being ye Hospital now."

== See also ==
- Fort Pitt (Pennsylvania)
- Fort Prince George
- French and Indian War
- Hugh Mercer
- Pennsylvania forts in the French and Indian War
