= Venango Path =

Native American trail in Pennsylvania

Venango Path was a Native American trail between the Forks of the Ohio (present day Pittsburgh) and Presque Isle, Pennsylvania, United States of America. The latter was located at Lake Erie. The trail, a portage between these important water routes, was named after the Lenape (formerly known as Delaware) village of Venango, at the confluence of French Creek and the Allegheny River. The village site was later developed by European Americans as the small city of Franklin, Pennsylvania.

== Washington's mission to Fort Le Boeuf ==
George Washington, a 21-year-old major in the colonial Virginia militia, and explorer Christopher Gist traveled along the trail during December 1753 to deliver a message to the French who had constructed Fort Le Boeuf near Venango, a Lenape village. The French were ordered to leave the area, as the British claimed control of the region. It had been contested between these powers for some time.

Washington and Gist stopped at the Indian village of Logstown (near present-day Ambridge, Pennsylvania) to meet with Iroquois and Lenape leaders. Chief Tanacharison and a warrior (Guyasuta) offered to accompany Washington and Gist. Washington and his men left the village a few days later and proceeded northeast through what is now Cranberry to Murdering Town along the Connoquenessing Creek.

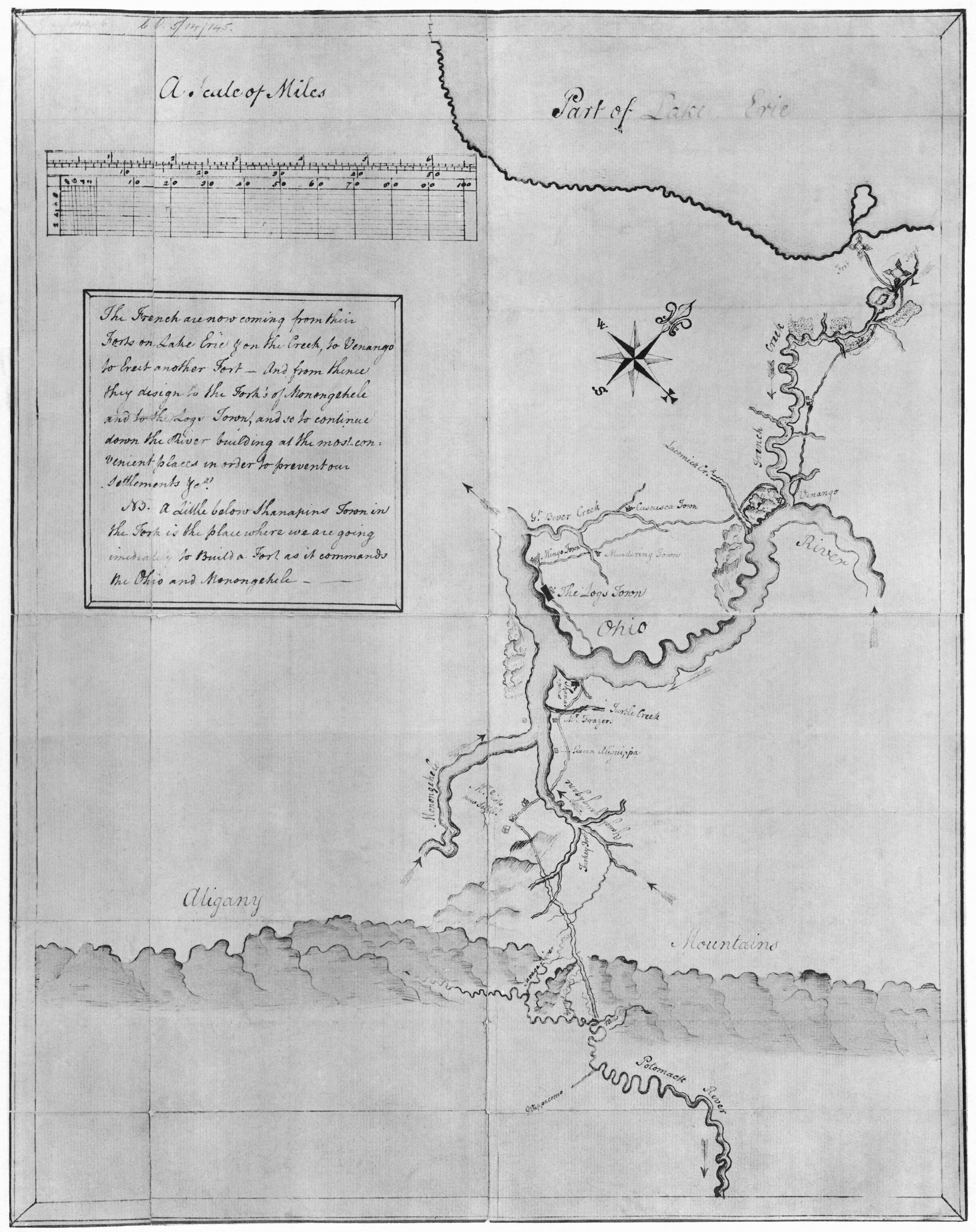
Washington's map of the region he passed through to Fort Le Boeuf

On their return from Fort Le Boeuf, Washington and Gist left the Venango Path at Murdering Town, which was located at or near present-day Evans City, and Harmony, Pennsylvania, on what Gist termed the "southeast fork of Beaver creek" (present-day Connoquenessing Creek). A Native at the village agreed to guide them down a different trail to the Forks. After marching several miles to the northeast of the original path, the Native turned on Washington and Gist, and fired his gun at them. The men escaped harm, but Gist wanted to execute the Native man. Washington ordered his attempted killer released. After this incident, the two men traveled "across country" through the forest, using a compass to reach "the head of Piney creek." From there, they traveled downstream to the Allegheny River. After spending the night on a small island (Herr's Island, later renamed Washington's Landing), they moved a short distance downriver, just above the Native village of Shannopin's Town. From there, they continued their trek back to Williamsburg, Virginia, the colony's capital, which they reached on January 16, 1754.

== French and Indian War ==
During the early French and Indian War years, when the French occupied western Pennsylvania, the trail was improved and used as a military road connecting a series of French forts from Lake Erie to Pittsburgh that were constructed to defend it against the British colonists. These forts included Fort Presque Isle located on Lake Erie, Fort Le Boeuf (present-day Waterford), Fort Machault at Venango (present-day Franklin) and Fort Duquesne at present-day Pittsburgh.

When the British drove the French from Western Pennsylvania (1758), the French burned and abandoned all four forts. The British rebuilt all four again during 1759, renaming Fort Machault as Fort Venango, and Fort Duquesne as Fort Pitt. Thus the British continued to use the Venango Path as a military road.

During Pontiac's War four years later (1763), hostile warriors from several tribes burned Forts Presque Isle, Le Boeuf and Venango, in an attempt to push the colonists from the region. After the Battle of Bushy Run, where a British army defeated several combined warrior bands, the Natives relocated into Ohio and westward. They gave up use of Venango Path. After hostilities ceased in western Pennsylvania, the British also abandoned major military use of the trail.
