= Fort Franklin (Venango County, Pennsylvania) =

18th century fort in Pennsylvania

- Near Franklin, Pennsylvania, United States

Site information
- Type: Fort

Location
- Former location of Fort Franklin in Pennsylvania
- Coordinates: 41.38932°N 79.82217°W

Site history
- Built: 1787
- In use: 1787-1796
- Materials: Wood
- Battles/wars: Northwest Indian War

Garrison information
- Past commanders: Captain Jonathan Heart; Lieutenant Polhemus
- Garrison: 25-87

Pennsylvania Historical Marker
- Designated: 1947

Fort Franklin was a post-Revolutionary War fort built in 1787 on French Creek in what is now Venango County, Pennsylvania to protect local settlers from Native American raids during the Northwest Indian War. During the preceding years, settlers threatened by raids would have had to seek shelter at Fort Pitt. Westward expansion of white settlements led to continual conflict with Native Americans, who were forced out of lands they had traditionally occupied. Fort Franklin quickly became the center of a growing community, the town of Franklin, Pennsylvania. Fort Franklin was never attacked, and it was replaced in 1796 by "The Garrison," a stockaded blockhouse, which was in turn abandoned in 1803, after military protection was no longer considered necessary.

== History ==
=== Construction ===
1796 map showing northeastern Ohio and western Pennsylvania, with Fort Franklin shown on the center right side of the page.

In April 1787, Captain Jonathan Heart was ordered from Fort Pitt to take a detachment of 87 soldiers from the First American Regiment and about a dozen workmen to a site on French Creek, about 85 miles north of Pittsburgh, not far from where Fort Venango had been burned during Pontiac's War in 1763. The site, situated on a bluff on the creek, twenty-five or thirty feet high, was chosen because of a ford across French Creek at that spot. The location also gave the fort strategic control over both the Allegheny River (a major trade route) and French Creek. The site was controversial, as the fort was some 990 feet from the confluence of French Creek and the Allegheny. Captain Heart defended his choice because of the "proximity of timber".

=== Description ===
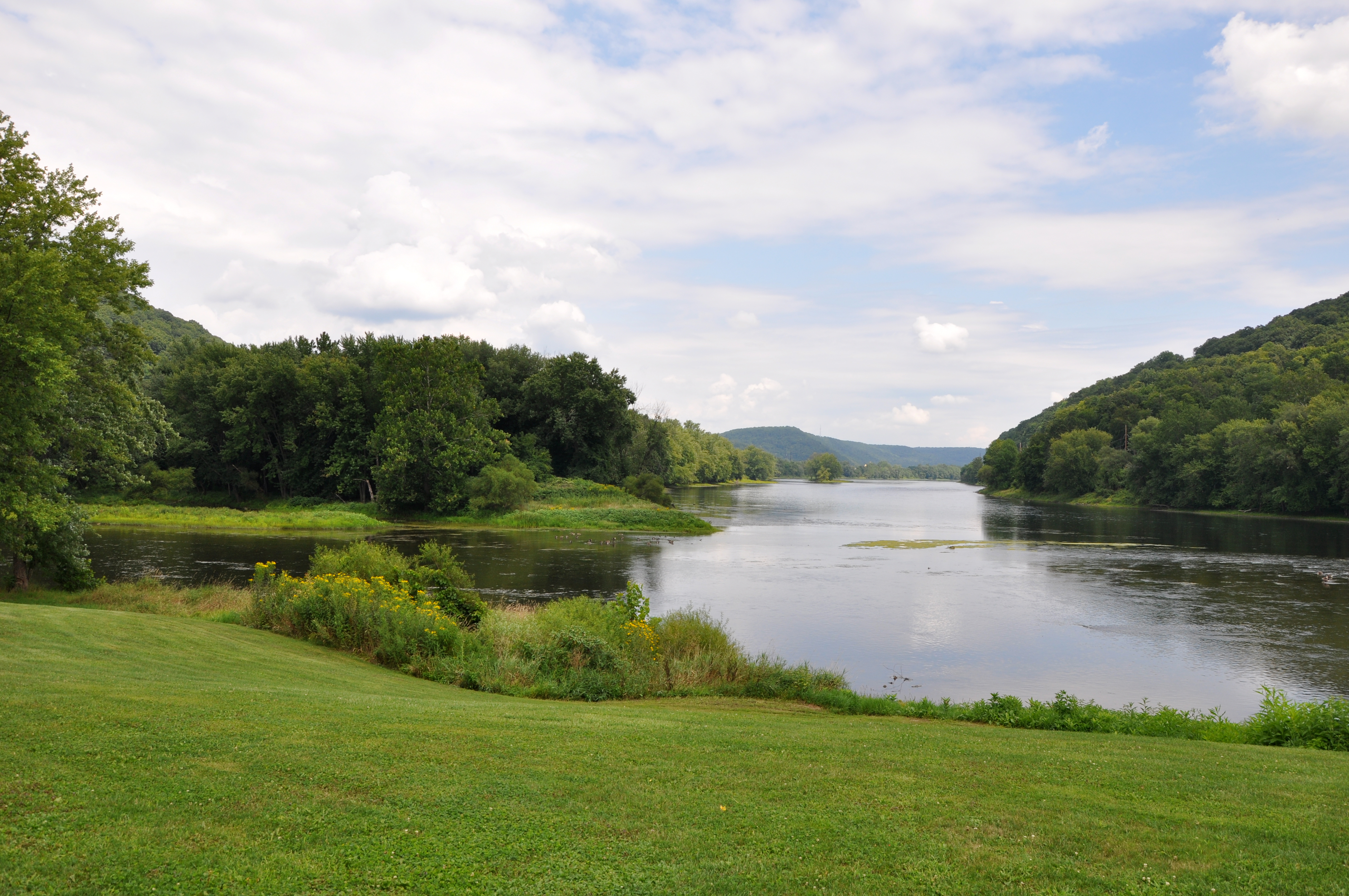
Site of Fort Franklin at the confluence of French Creek and the Allegheny River, photographed in 2012

Initially known as Captain Heart's Fort, Fort Franklin was built on a plan similar to Fort Venango, with a redoubt about one hundred feet square and a three-story blockhouse in the center. There were four bastions, each with a six-pounder cannon or a swivel gun. The fort featured a stone-lined gunpowder magazine and barracks with stone chimneys, adding to the expense of construction. A map of the fort and the surrounding area, which Captain Heart sent to Brigadier General Josiah Harmar on June 1 1787, shows a bakery, a blacksmith's shop, a smokehouse, a butcher shop and a military hospital already built outside the fort.

Fort Franklin was surrounded by fertile farmland along the river. Within months, farmers, craftsmen and vendors had started constructing buildings near the fort, including a hotel. Within a year, Andrew Ellicott, who surveyed Washington, D.C., was hired to lay out the town of Franklin.

In a letter to the US Department of War dated October 2 1788, a committee assigned to inspect fortifications reported:

"Fort Franklin, on French creek, near a post formerly called Venango, is a small strong fort, with one cannon, was erected in 1787, and garrisoned with one company. The excellent construction and execution of this work reflects honor in the abilities and industry of Capt. Heart, who garrisons it with his company and was his own engineer. This post was established for the purpose of defending the frontiers of Pennsylvania, which are much exposed by the facility with which the Indians can cross from Lake Erie...and thence descend the rapid river Allegheny."

By June 1794, the fort's garrison was reduced to 25 men under the command of Lieutenant Polhemus. When Andrew Ellicott visited, he noted that the fort was in need of repairs. Rising tension with Native Americans led the Pennsylvania government to refurbish forts along the New York border. Ellicott wrote:

"On my arrival, the place appeared to be in such a defenceless condition, that, with the concurrence of Captain Denny, and the officer (Captain Heart) commanding at the fort, we remained there some time, and employed the troops in rendering it more tenable. It may now be considered as defensible, provided the number of men is increased. The garrison, at present, consists of twenty-five men." (Note: Ellicott's reference to Captain Heart being at the fort in 1794 is puzzling, as the captain was killed at the Battle of the Wabash on November 4, 1791. According to Major Denny's journal, Captain Heart was promoted to major and transferred to another regiment in March, 1791.)

Captain Denny echoed these statements, reporting in his journal:

"Found Fort Franklin in a wretched state of defense. The men in the fort, about twenty, almost all invalids and unable to make any repairs. The officer and his command under great apprehension of an attack from the Indians, who were in considerable numbers about the place, and very insulting...Accordingly we set to work. A new set of pickets was brought from the woods, and in four days an entire new work erected round the block-house, which we left in tolerable defensible order."

=== The Garrison ===
By 1794, a bridge had been built over French Creek adjacent to the fort. The fort's garrison was increased to 100 men, after warnings that the British were in alliance with Cornplanter and intended to attack the area. In a deposition at Fort Pitt on June 11 1794, D. Ransom, a trader at Fort Franklin, reported that "he had been advised to leave [and]...that the British and Indians would soon...form a junction with Cornplanter, on French creek; and were then to clear it by killing all the people, and taking all the forts on it." The attack did not happen, as a peace treaty was signed in August 1795.

In 1796, "The Garrison," a strong wooden building about thirty by thirty-six feet in size and a story and a half high, was built. This smaller fortification was located close to the confluence of French Creek and the Allegheny and was intended to house a reduced garrison, mainly to protect the bridge over French Creek.

=== Abandonment ===
Following the Treaty of Greenville in August 1795, there was no further need for military protection, and Fort Franklin was dismantled and its materials repurposed in the construction of the town. The Garrison (now referred to as the Old Garrison) was handed over to the county in 1803 and served as the Venango County Jail from 1804 to 1819, after which it was abandoned. It collapsed in 1824. The site has been inundated by the Allegheny River.

== Memorialization ==
A historical marker commemorating Fort Franklin was erected in 1947 by the Pennsylvania Historical and Museum Commission at the intersection of 13th Street (U.S. 322) and Franklin Avenue in Franklin. A historical marker for the Old Garrison was also placed in 1947, at the intersection of Liberty Street and 10th Street in Franklin.
