= Lower Landing Archeological District =

Historic district in New York, United States

- U.S. National Register of Historic Places
- U.S. Historic district
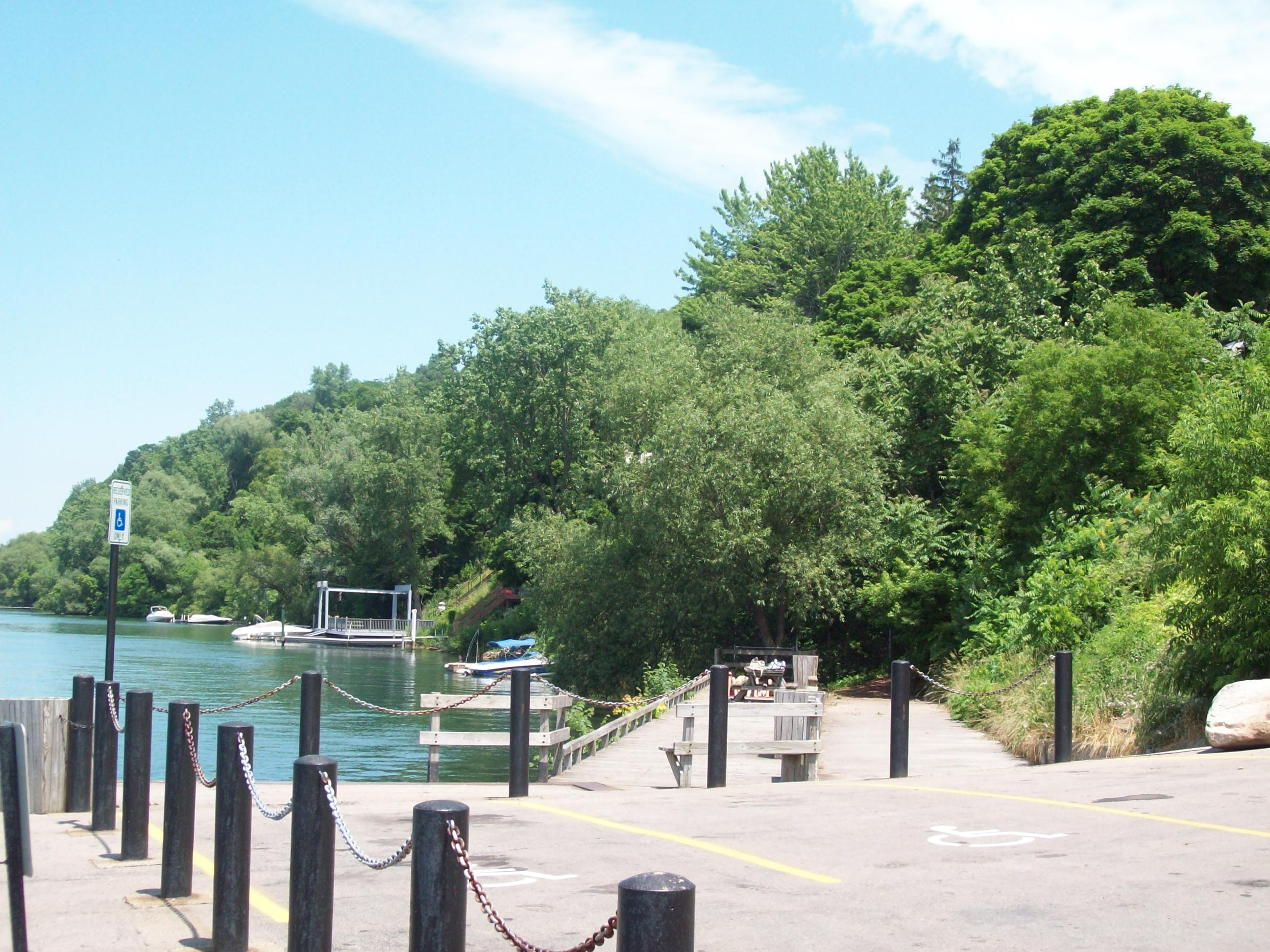
- Lower Landing Archeological District, June 2009
- Nearest city: Lewiston, New York
- Built: 1759
- Architect: Chabert de Joncaire et al.; Delmer, Lt. John
- NRHP reference No.: 74001280
- Added to NRHP: July 18, 1974

Lower Landing Archeological District is a historic archeological site located at Lewiston in Niagara County, New York. The district comprises the area that served as the western end of the portage for goods around Niagara Falls. It is located on east bank of the Niagara River.

== History ==
Frenchman Louis-Thomas Chabert de Joncaire's trading post which was constructed in 1719, Fort Niagara, was the first permanent structure built by a white man in Lewiston. Joncaire had received permission from the Seneca Indians and the trading post was located on the site of today's Artpark parking lot (which is located immediately east of the main theater). While the post is no longer standing the ruins were studied in the 1950s and it indicated that the structure had been destroyed by fire in 1741. The exact location of the trading Post is where Artpark's "painted parking lot" is today.

It was listed on the National Register of Historic Places in 1974.
