= Fort Machault =

18th century fort in colonial Pennsylvania

- Venango County, Pennsylvania near Franklin, Pennsylvania
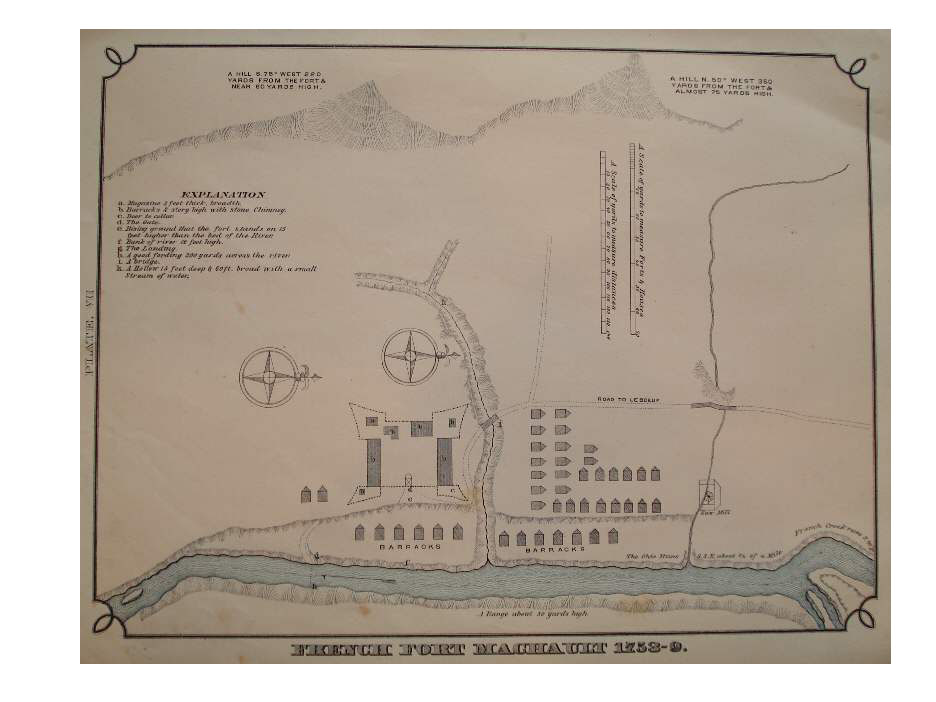
- Map showing Fort Machault and its outbuildings.

Site information
- Type: Military fort

Location
- Location of Fort Machault in Pennsylvania
- Coordinates: 41°23′52″N 79°49′53″W

Site history
- Built: 1754
- In use: 1754–1759
- Battles/wars: French and Indian War

Garrison information
- Past commanders: Philippe-Thomas Chabert de Joncaire; Michel Maray de La Chauvignerie; François-Marie Le Marchand de Lignery
- Garrison: 6-100 French and Canadian marines

Pennsylvania Historical Marker
- Designated: 1969

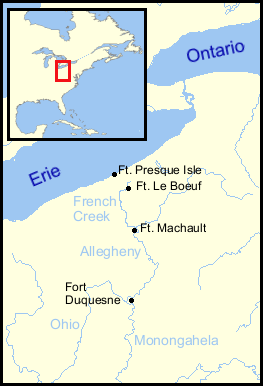
French Forts, 1753 and 1754

Fort Machault (/mɑːˈʃɔːl/, French: [maʃol]) was a fort built by the French in 1754 near the confluence of French Creek with the Allegheny River, in northwest Pennsylvania. (Present-day Franklin developed here later.) The fort helped the French control these waterways, part of what was known as the Venango Path from Lake Erie to the Ohio River. It was one of four forts designed to protect French access to the Ohio Country and connections between its northern and southern colonies. From north to south the forts were Fort Presque Isle (at Lake Erie), Fort Le Boeuf (at the south end of the portage leading to the head of French Creek), Fort Machault (at the confluence noted), and Fort Duquesne. In January 1759 the British launched an expedition to attack Fort Machault, but had to turn back after encountering resistance from French-Allied Native Americans. The fort was abandoned by the French in August 1759, and burned so that the British could not use it. It was replaced by the British in 1760 with Fort Venango.

== Description ==
Fort Machault was built on a hill, 60 yards west of the Allegheny River. The fort was in the form of a parallelogram, about 75 by 105 feet (32 m). The curtain was made of hewed timber, stacked lengthwise. The four corners had bastions in the form of polygons. The bastions were built of saplings, eight inches (200 mm) thick, and 13 feet (4.0 m) in height. The gate fronted the river. Inside the fort were a gunpowder magazine and several officer's barracks, built in two stories with stone chimneys. The soldiers' barracks consisted of 45 buildings outside the fort.

== History ==
=== Establishment ===
In 1753, Governor General Michel-Ange Duquesne de Menneville ordered construction of a fortified trading post at the confluence of the Allegheny River and French Creek at Venango, a Lenape village. Originally, Paul Marin de la Malgue had planned to build a fortified blockhouse and trading post named Fort D'Anjou, but Governor Duquesne put the plan on hold. In August 1753, Philippe-Thomas Chabert de Joncaire was sent up the Allegheny River by canoe to explore the area, and found activity by English traders with local Native American communities. The French felt that they would lose influence in the area and decided to build a chain of fortresses from Lake Erie south. Mauchault was the last of four forts intended to protect French access to waterways connecting the Great Lakes and Ohio River, and ultimately the Mississippi River.

Prior to the arrival of the French in 1753, John Fraser, a Scots immigrant, blacksmith, and trader from Pennsylvania, had set up shop on this site. He supplied Native Americans in the region with trade goods and repaired their guns and other metal wares in exchange for furs. His business was an example of the western expansion of Pennsylvania's fur trade that prompted the French to fortify the Ohio Country, for fear of losing their trade and influence among the Indians there. In August 1753, the French decided to occupy Fraser's trading post, from which Fraser was absent at the time. The Lenape chief Custaloga assisted the French by capturing and handing over two traders who had just arrived at the trading post. Fraser and his employee William were forced to flee, and 75 French soldiers took over Fraser's cabin, allowing Custaloga to confiscate Fraser's trade goods. Fraser's cabin was occupied by Philippe-Thomas Chabert de Joncaire.

=== Visit by George Washington, 1753 ===
In December 1753, Major George Washington of the Virginia militia used the Venango Path to reach Fort Machault during his first expedition into the Ohio Country. Washington, with an escort of seven men, including Christopher Gist, Guyasuta and Tanacharison, carried a letter from Governor Robert Dinwiddie of Virginia, protesting the French invasion of lands claimed by Great Britain and demanding their immediate withdrawal. Washington wrote:

"We found the French Colours hoisted at a House which they drove Mr. John Fraser, an English Subject, from; I immediately repaired to it, to know where the Commander resided: There were three Officers, one of whom, Capt. Joncaire, inform'd me, that he had the Command of the Ohio, But that there was a General Officer at the near Fort, which he advised me to for an Answer. He invited us to sup with them, and treated us with the greatest Complaisance."

Joncaire provided Washington's men with wine and brandy, and when intoxicated, Washington's Native American companions declared their loyalty to the French. It took Washington three days to persuade them to move on to Fort Le Boeuf, where they met the French commander Jacques Legardeur de Saint-Pierre. The French refused to withdraw, and Washington returned to Williamsburg on January 16.

=== Construction ===
By the next year Fraser's cabin and his forge had been incorporated by the French into the new fort. Initially, Fraser's buildings were simply enclosed in a crude stockade during the early months of 1754, but the structure was improved over time, so that by April 1755 Governor General Vaudreuil described it as "a little stockaded fort at the mouth of the Rivière au Boeuf, merely to surround the storehouses which we are using as a supply post."

Joncaire was replaced in 1754 by Michel Maray de La Chauvignerie as the officer in charge of constructing the fort, which eventually was named Fort Machault, in honor of prominent financier, Jean-Baptiste Machault d'Arnouville, the French Minister of the Marine at the time of its construction. It was also known as "Venango," from "Weningo," the name of the nearby Delaware (Lenape) village. Captain Pierre Pouchot, chief engineer of the forces in Canada, wrote: "At the mouth of Rivière Le Boeuf, called in English Venango, the French have a very poor, mean fort, called Fort Machault." The French intended to build a larger fort nearby, but La Chauvignerie's construction efforts were set back by shortages of manpower and wood, resulting in sporadic construction.

=== Attempted rebuilding ===
In 1755, plans were made to rebuild Fort Machault at another nearby location. An escaped prisoner, John Adam Long, reported that a number of square logs had been "got together at that place sufficient to build a large fort on a pretty, rising ground in the Forks of Ohio and French creek." Captain Daniel Liénard de Beaujeu was assigned to supervise the construction, but a letter from another officer indicates that the work was interrupted by the Braddock Expedition:

"He continued on his way to...Camp Machaut, at the mouth of this river, where...he had orders to have a fort constructed, which they were not able to do; having learned that the English were marching on Fort Duquesne, they were content to leave carpenters to prepare the necessary wood and went on to the aid of that place."

However, in June, La Chauvignerie reported being unable to locate trees large enough for the construction: "Beginning tomorrow, Sir, I am going to send all my men to search the surrounding woods for places where we can find an abundance of construction wood for the above-mentioned fort." By mid-July, he had not succeeded, writing, "I searched carefully through all the surrounding woods and I found almost no wood suitable for constructing the fort according to the plan which was set up and the kind of wood that was to be used. This will force us perhaps to go about it differently or to decide to obtain wood from a great distance." He eventually managed to find trees, but did not have enough men or horses, and the project was again delayed. La Chauvignerie then requested that Gaspard-Joseph Chaussegros de Léry, an engineer, take over the construction, but de Léry found that tools and other supplies were insufficient, and felt that the location selected for the fort was "disadvantageous." Although the land had been cleared and a large quantity of wood cut and transported to the site, the new fort was never built.

Renovations continued on the existing fort. As late as March, 1758, a French deserter reported in Philadelphia that "they are now working at Fort Machaull in great numbers & propose to make it as strong as Fort Duquesne." In November 1758, La Chauvignerie was replaced by François-Marie Le Marchand de Lignery.

=== Capture of Michel Joseph Maray de La Chauvignerie ===
On October 12, 1757, a French officer appeared at Fort Henry asking to surrender. Under questioning, he identified himself as Enseigne en second Michel Joseph Maray de La Chauvignerie, 15-year-old son of Michel Maray de La Chauvignerie, commander of Fort Machault. He had left the fort on October 1 with a raiding party of Native American warriors, had become separated from them after five days, and had lost his way. He wandered in the forest for a week before reaching Fort Henry. In reference to Fort Machault, he reported: "the Fort there is very strong, pallisadoed round, has a Glacis with a dry Ditch three Foot deep." He described the fort as "A Fort of wood, filled up with earth. It has Bastions and 6 Wall-Pieces, or Swivel Guns; and the whole Works take up about 2 Acres of Grounds. [The garrison consists of] Fifty regulars & forty Canadians." He was detained in Philadelphia and released in a prisoner exchange in April 1759.

=== Garrison ===
John Adam Long, who had escaped from French captivity in April 1756, reported that, at "Venango...resided an officer in a small stockade fort with a command of forty men." In 1756, William Johnson, a deserter from Fort Cumberland whose real name was William Marshall, had escaped from captivity among Native Americans and reported that there was "at Venango a Captain's command of about 50 men; the Fort of Stockades, very weak, and scarce of provisions..." He described Fort Machault as "a small fort made of logs and stockades...mounted with nine cannon of a pretty large bore, and was generally garrisoned with a company of sixty soldiers, besides Indians, who to the number of about two hundred are lodged in cabins that have been built for them near the fort...The Garrison...hath been for some time employed in Collecting and preparing Materials for building a Strong Fort there next Spring." Jacob Hochstetler, who was captured by Lenape warriors in September 1757, was brought to Fort Machault and then sold to a Seneca family in a nearby community. He escaped in 1758 and made his way to Fort Augusta, where he reported that the garrison at Fort Machault was only 25 men. Christian Frederick Post visited the fort in August 1758 with several Lenape guides, including the Lenape leader Pisquetomen. Post did not enter the fort for fear of being taken prisoner, but described it in his journal:

"7th. We came in sight of fort Venango, belonging to the French, situate between two mountains, in a fork of the Ohio river...By what I could learn of Pisquetumen, and the Indians who went into the fort, the garrison consisted of only six men, and an officer blind of one eye." (La Chauvignerie was blind in one eye.)

After abandoning Fort Duquesne in November 1758, the French fell back to Fort Machault. The British expected them to launch a counterattack from there in the following campaign season. In 1758, Colonel Hugh Mercer stated that there were about 100 soldiers at Fort Machault, where the French had 11 flat-bottomed boats called batteaux, "and one great gun of the size of a quart pot which they fire off by a train of powder." In March 1759, Mercer reported that a Native American spy named Bull had entered the fort and observed that the garrison consisted of two officers and forty men.

=== Assault on Fort Machault ===
Once the British took Fort Duquesne, Fort Machault became the primary French stronghold on the frontier with British territory. In January 1759, Colonel Hugh Mercer wrote this description of Fort Machault, which the French were strengthening in anticipation of an assault:

"The Soldiers [are] employed in Repairing the Fort. It is a Square with four Bastions. The Barracks form three of the Curtains and tall Stockades enclose the Bastions. No Ditch and but one Swivel pointing down the River. The fort stands about 200 Yds from the Ohio, a little below the Junction of French Creek. The Curtain opposite the Gate which fronts the River is taken down And New Loggs prepared and the Trench dug for planting them."

Governor Vaudreuil, however, felt that the fort was neither strong enough nor properly positioned to withstand an assault. He wrote in January 1759:

"The Machault post is, to be exact, only a supply post. At most, it can only be put in shape to resist musketry-fire. It is too weak to be able to sustain a siege; cannon would quickly demolish it. It is, moreover, so poorly located that from the top of the mountains, which are very near, everything happening inside can be seen."

On March 25, 1759, Colonel Hugh Mercer, the British commander at Fort Pitt (which was still under construction), launched an assault on Fort Machault. Two hundred men marched on land while fifty men escorted ten bateaux of supplies on the river. The troops were slowed by heavy rains and a river swollen with snowmelt, however, and by March 28 they had advanced only twenty miles when Shawnee and Lenape warriors attacked them, killing the men in one boat and causing the other men on the river to turn back. The troops on land also retreated, and the assault was abandoned.

=== Abandonment, 1759 ===
In July 1759, the French began a campaign to capture Mercer's Fort, a temporary fort at the construction site where Fort Pitt was being built. Nearly a thousand French and Canadiens and a thousand Native Americans mustered at Fort Machault. The British, however, began a siege of the French Fort Niagara, forcing the French to abandon their assault on Fort Pitt as all available forces were sent to attempt to relieve Fort Niagara. On July 25, 1759, following their defeat, the French surrendered Fort Niagara. De Lignery and La Chauvignerie were both captured, and it is unclear who was in command at Fort Machault.

In August 1759, Governor Vaudreuil, expecting a British military assault, ordered his troops to "fall back successively upon Forts Le Boeuf and Presqu' Isle, and so completely destroy the works as to leave nothing behind that would be available to the enemy." Trade goods were given away to Native Americans, other goods and property were loaded onto wagons, and the fort's swivel guns were spiked and buried. On August 6, before retreating to Canada, the French burned Fort Machault to the ground to prevent its use by the British. Two British officers arrived at the site of the fort on October 9, 1759, and reported: "Venango furnished us with nothing but the Remains of a Reduced Fort, and about 44 Houses, with one Swivel and a Quantity of Broken Gun Barrels and Old Iron." Colonel Henry Bouquet later reported that "The stockadoe Fort here is burnt to the ground, and the few Huts round it pulled down."

In 1760, the British built Fort Venango near the site of former Fort Machault. The present-day city of Franklin, Pennsylvania developed here.

== Archaeological investigations ==
In 2007, an archaeological survey was conducted to locate Fort Machault and to determine the potential for a full excavation. A bucket auger survey was implemented, and samples revealed cultural features and possible French and Indian War-era artifacts on the west side of Elk Street and south of an old stream channel. Residents of Franklin have found both English and French coins dating to the 18th century, as well as a cannon, which was refurbished and used to fire blank charges on the Fourth of July.

== Memorialization ==
A historical marker was placed in Franklin, Pennsylvania in 1969 by the Pennsylvania Historical and Museum Commission. A site marker at 616 Elk Street in Franklin indicates where the fort stood.

== Sources ==
- Albert, George Dallas. The Frontier Forts of Western Pennsylvania, Harrisburg: C. M. Busch, state printer, 1896. Description of the fort, pp. 585–590. Location of the fort, p. 586, "On the present plan of the city of Franklin, Elk street passes through the site of the fort, whilst its southern side reaches nearly to Sixth street." Google Earth indicates that this position is at 41.386117 -79.821679
