= Fort Venango =

18th century fort in colonial Pennsylvania

- Near Franklin, Pennsylvania, United States

Site information
- Type: Fort
- Controlled by: United Kingdom

Location
- Former location of the Fort Venango in Pennsylvania
- Coordinates: 41.38932°N 79.82217°W

Site history
- Built: 1760
- In use: 1760-1763
- Materials: Wood
- Battles/wars: Pontiac's Rebellion

Pennsylvania Historical Marker
- Designated: October 10, 1971

Fort Venango was a small British fort built in 1760 near the present-day site of Franklin, Pennsylvania. It replaced Fort Machault, a French fort built at the confluence of French Creek and the Allegheny River. In August 1759, near the end of the French and Indian War, after the French surrender of Fort Niagara to the British, the French burned Fort Machault and retreated north. Fort Venango was built during summer 1760. It was attacked and destroyed in June 1763 during Pontiac's War.

== Background ==
With the capture of Fort Duquesne by the British in November 1758, and the capture of Fort Niagara in July 1759, the French were forced to withdraw from Pennsylvania, abandoning and burning Fort Machault, Fort Le Boeuf, and Fort Presque Isle in August 1759. General Robert Monckton held a conference with Native American leaders and obtained their permission to build and maintain forts in western Pennsylvania.

== Construction ==
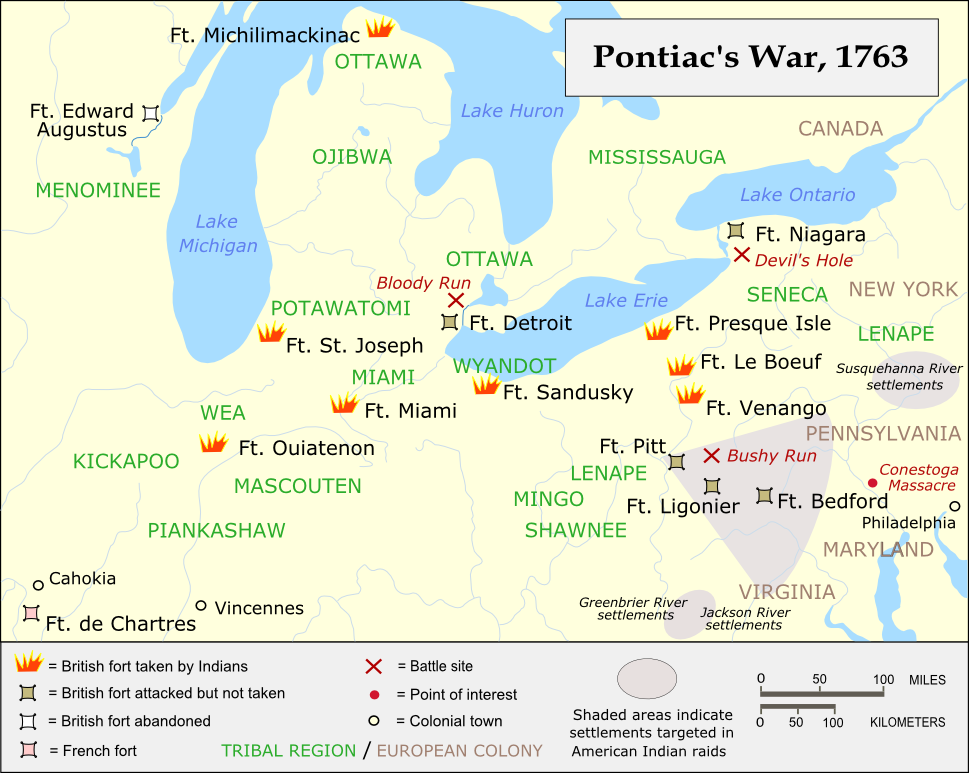
Forts and battles of Pontiac's War in 1763. Fort Venango is shown in relation to other forts in use during the war.

According to the History of Venango County (1879):

"At this place an entirely new site was selected, and a new fort erected. Fort Machault was so thoroughly dismantled that there was nothing valuable left. The site for the new work was about forty rods higher up the river, and nearer the mouth of French Creek...It was a much more permanent and substantial work than that of the French...The general outline was a square, with bastions projecting from the curtains. The enclosed area was eighty-eight feet square, with a blockhouse in the center. This was surrounded by a ditch twenty-four feet in width. Outside of this was the embankment, about eight feet in width, with bastions of earth on each side, and completely commanding all the angles of the fort."

The British named the fort after the nearby Lenape village, Venango, derived from the Native American name, Onenge, meaning otter.

== Destruction, 1763 ==
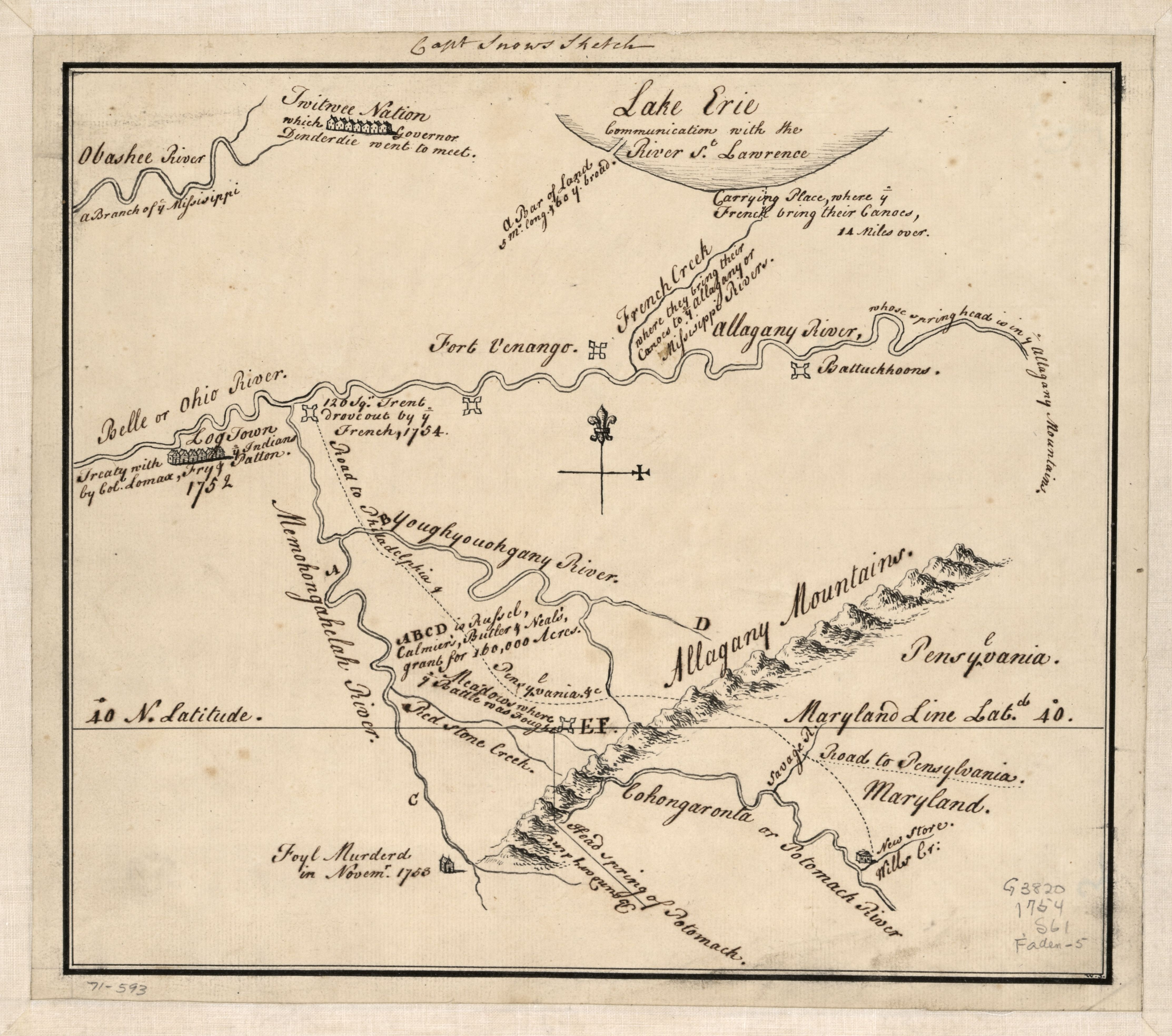
Captain Snow's map of western Pennsylvania, showing the site of Fort Venango, just above the center of the page

On June 16 1763, during Pontiac's War, Fort Venango was captured by Seneca and Mingo warriors led by the Seneca chief Guyasuta, gaining entrance to the fort by pretending to be unarmed and friendly. According to one account, the commander, Lieutenant Francis Gordon, recognized Guyasuta, having negotiated with him several times before, and allowed him and a group of warriors to enter the fort. Another source states that the warriors pretended to be playing ball outside the fort, and when the ball flew over the wall, they ran in after it, then attacked the garrison. They killed the 16 soldiers of the garrison, then knocked on the door of the commander's office in the blockhouse. Lieutenant Gordon, unaware of the attack, opened the door and was captured. The warriors forced him to write a letter detailing why the Indians had risen against the British. He recorded two complaints:

"First, the scarcity & Dearness of [gun]Powder for these two years past being obliged to pay 2 Dearskins for a Gill of Powder...and that when they complained, they were Ill-treated & never Redressed; Secondly, that the many Posts which the English kept possession of Induced them to believe they Intended to possess all their country; for all which they were Determined to Destroy them."

1770 map of Pennsylvania showing Fort Venango ("Venango F.") in the center of the upper left quadrant, on French Creek

The warriors then subjected Gordon to ritual slow torture and burned him to death at the stake, after which they burned Fort Venango to the ground. Two Onondaga warriors described these events to Sir William Johnson in July 1763. Another source reports that a woman who was at the fort and was taken prisoner, later described its capture.

When General Jeffery Amherst learned what had happened to Lieutenant Gordon, he wrote to Colonel Henry Bouquet, "No Punishment We can Inflict is Adequate to the Crimes of those Inhumane Villains."

== Aftermath ==
When the survivors of the attack on Fort Le Boeuf reached Fort Venango a few days later, they found the burnt corpses of its garrison lying in the fort's smoking ruins. The site of the fort served as a parade ground for troops during the American Revolutionary War, then the earth was repurposed during the construction of the town of Franklin, Pennsylvania. In 1787, Fort Franklin was constructed within a few hundred yards of the site of Fort Venango.

== Memorialization ==
A historical marker is located where the fort formerly stood, on 8th and Elk Streets (US 322), in Franklin. It was erected on October 10, 1971, by the Pennsylvania Historical and Museum Commission. A stone roadside marker nearby reads: "Site of Fort Venango, erected by the English in 1760; taken and burned by Indians, 1763."
