= Michel Maray de La Chauvignerie =

French army officer and interpreter

- Born: January 24, 1701; Montreal, New France
- Died: 10 August 1778 (aged 74) Paris, France
- Allegiance: France
- Known for: Commander of Fort Machault
- Conflicts: 7 Years War Battle of La Belle-Famille
- Children: 1 son

Michel Maray de La Chauvignerie (January 24, 1704 – August 10, 1778), also known as Michel Maray, sieur de la La Chauvignerie, was a French military officer in the Troupes de la Marine and interpreter of Iroquoian languages.

== Biography ==
Michel Maray de La Chauvignerie was born on January 24, 1704, in Montreal, New France to Sieur Louis Maray de la Chauvignerie, an officer in the Troupes de la Marine, and Catherine Joly. He was baptized in Montreal, New France on September 5, 1704.

Together with Louis-Thomas Chabert de Joncaire, La Chauvignerie convinced several Native American tribes to renew their alliance with New France at a banquet in Montreal by singing an Iroquois war song when New France was threatened by an attack from the British in August 1711.

In 1736, La Chauvignerie published a list of names from the Ojibwe and other peoples that he had compiled.

In June 1755, Lieutenant La Chauvignerie replaced Philippe-Thomas Chabert de Joncaire as the officer in charge of constructing Fort Machault (initially known as Fort d'Anjou). His construction efforts were set back by shortages of manpower and wood, resulting in sporadic construction and improvements until November 1758 when he was replaced by François-Marie Le Marchand de Lignery. During the French and Indian War, La Chauvignerie and Lignery left Fort Machault to relieve Fort Niagara when it was sieged by the British in July 1759. The ensuing Battle of La Belle-Famille resulted in the capture of La Chauvignerie, the death of Lignery, and the loss of Fort Niagara.

La Chauvignerie died on August 10, 1778, in Paris, France.

== Personal life ==
On August 16, 1740, La Chauvignerie married Marie-Joseph Raimbaut. They had one son, Michel Joseph Maray de La Chauvignerie, born in 1741.
