= Fort Presque Isle =

Fort in present-day Pennsylvania, U.S.

- Erie, Pennsylvania, U.S.
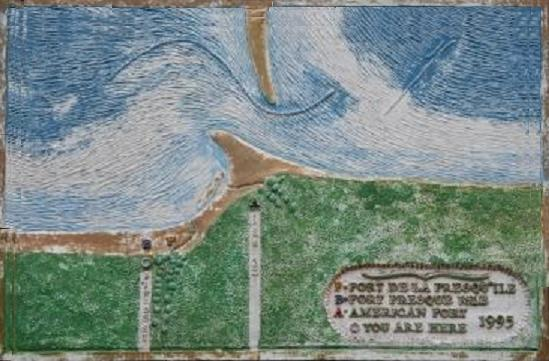
- Commemorative plaque of Fort Presque Isle location

Site information
- Controlled by: France 1753–1759 (Kingdom of Great Britain) British Empire 1759–1763; United States 1786–1852

Location
- Coordinates: 42.137085°N 80.079374°W

Site history
- Built: 1753
- In use: 1753–1763; 1786–1852
- Demolished: 1852
- Battles/wars: Pontiac's Rebellion

Fort Presque Isle (also Fort de la Presqu'île) was a fort built by French soldiers in summer 1753 along Presque Isle Bay in present-day Erie, Pennsylvania, to protect the northern terminus of the Venango Path. It was the first of the French posts built in the Ohio Country, and was part of a line that included Fort Le Boeuf, Fort Machault, and Fort Duquesne.

== History ==
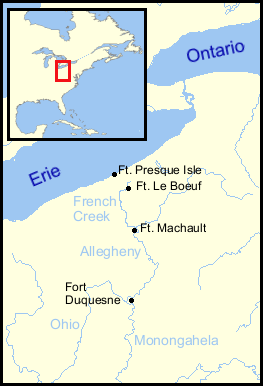
Forts of 1753–54

The fort was built as part of the French military occupation of the Ohio Country; rival claims to the area by the British led to the French and Indian War. After the 1759 British victory at the Battle of Fort Niagara, the French burned the fort and retreated from the area. There is a marker at E Front St and Parade Street commemorating the site, which was located amongst the houses in the southeast corner of E Front and Parade.

The British built a new Fort Presque Isle, which was captured by American Indians during Pontiac's Rebellion. On June 19, 1763, the fort was surrounded by about 250 Ottawas, Ojibwas, Wyandots, and Senecas. After holding out for two days, the garrison of approximately sixty men surrendered on the condition that they could return to Fort Pitt. Most were instead killed after emerging from the fort.

General Anthony Wayne first arrived in the area of Presque Isle in 1786. In 1795, 200 Federal troops from Wayne's army, under the direction of Captain John Grubb, built a blockhouse on Garrison Hill (located in front of then Garrison Grounds), in present-day Erie, Pennsylvania. Also named Fort Presque Isle, the blockhouse was used as part of a defense against Native American uprisings. It was also used during the War of 1812. General Wayne was stricken ill at Fort Presque Isle and died there in 1796. At his request, his body was buried under the flagpole of the northwest blockhouse of the fort. This blockhouse burned in 1852. In 1880, the Commonwealth of Pennsylvania reconstructed the blockhouse at Second and Ash Streets, Erie, as a memorial to General Wayne. The Pennsylvania Historical and Museum Commission has recognized the reconstructed blockhouse as eligible for placement on the National Register of Historic Places. The blockhouse is located at N 42° 08.400, W 80° 04.463. The site is now within the grounds of Pennsylvania Soldiers' and Sailors' Home and last rebuilt in 1984.

== Sources ==
- "The Frontier Forts of Western Pennsylvania," Albert, George Dallas, C. M. Busch, state printer, Harrisburg, PA, 1896. Tracing of plan of Erie, on pg. 536b, shows the "old French fort" between Front Street and Second Street, on the northeast side of Parade Street.
- Google Earth indicates this position is 42.137085 -80.079374
- 2002 Congressional Resolution to Reconstruct the fort
- Location of the General Wayne Blockhouse
