= Fort Le Boeuf =

French fort established in 1753

Fort Le Bœuf
- Waterford, Pennsylvania, USA
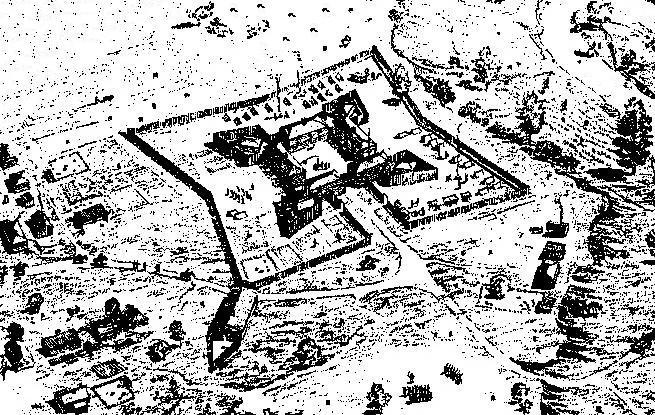
- Fort Le Bœuf during 1754.

Site information
- Controlled by: Kingdom of France 1753–1759; Kingdom of Great Britain 1759–1763

Location
- Coordinates: 41°56′22″N 79°58′57″W

Site history
- Built: 1753
- In use: 1753–1763
- Demolished: 18 June 1763
- Battles/wars: French and Indian War; Pontiac's Rebellion

Garrison information
- Past commanders: Jacques Legardeur de Saint-Pierre

Fort Le Bœuf (often referred to as Fort de la Rivière au Bœuf) was a fort established by the French during 1753 on a fork of French Creek (in the drainage area of the River Ohio), in present-day Waterford, in northwest Pennsylvania. The fort was part of a line that included Fort Presque Isle, Fort Machault, and Fort Duquesne.

The fort was located about 15 miles (24 km) from the shores of Lake Erie, on the banks of LeBoeuf Creek, for which the fort was named. The French portaged supplies and trade goods from Lake Erie overland to Fort Le Bœuf. From there they traveled by raft and canoe down French Creek to the rivers Allegheny, Ohio and Mississippi.

Today, the site of the fort is occupied by the Fort LeBoeuf Museum, operated by the Fort LeBoeuf Historical Society.

== History ==
Captain Paul Marin de la Malgue began construction on 11 July 1753; Jacques Legardeur de Saint-Pierre began command of the fort on 3 December 1753. This fort was the second of a series of posts that the French built between spring 1753 and summer 1754 to assert their possession of the Ohio Country. These four posts Fort Presque Isle, Fort LeBoeuf, Fort Machault, and Fort Duquesne ran from Lake Erie to the Forks of the Ohio; they represented the last links of France's effort to connect its dominions in Canada with those in the Illinois Country and Louisiana. They seized and occupied the British trading post of John Fraser, a Scottish fur trader, at the Lenape village of Venango at the junction of French Creek and the Allegheny River (where Franklin, Pennsylvania developed). Leaving a force to garrison the new posts, the French command returned to Canada for the winter.

Fort LeBoeuf (modern Waterford, Pennsylvania developed here) guarded the southern end of the portage road, known as the Venango Path, between Lake Erie and French Creek, which flowed to the Allegheny River and ultimately to the River Ohio. It served as a French trading post and garrison until 1759, when the capture of Fort Niagara forced the French to abandon the Ohio Country. On 1 August 1794, Major Ebenezer Denny reported to Governor Thomas Mifflin from Le Boeuf. He described a fortification with four blockhouses, manned by riflemen. The two rear blockhouses had a six-pound cannon on the second floor, as well as swivel guns over the gates.

=== Washington's mission ===
Robert Dinwiddie, the governor of Virginia, sent the 21-year-old George Washington, a major in the Virginia militia, to Fort Le Boeuf with seven escorts, in order to deliver a message to the French demanding that they leave the Ohio Country. Dinwiddie was responding to news of the French building forts in the Ohio Country. Washington took explorer Christopher Gist along as his guide; during the trip, Gist saved the young Washington's life on two occasions. Washington and Gist arrived at Fort Le Boeuf on 11 December 1753. Jacques Legardeur de Saint-Pierre, commandant at Fort Le Boeuf, a tough veteran of the west, received Washington politely, but contemptuously rejected his blustering ultimatum.

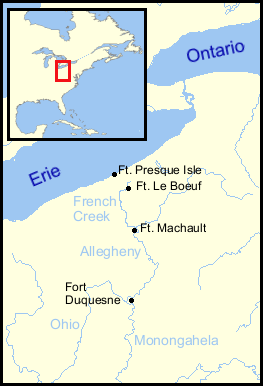
French Forts, 1753 and 1754

Jacques Legardeur de Saint-Pierre provided Washington with three days rest and hospitality at the fort, and then gave Washington a letter for him to deliver to Governor Dinwiddie. The letter ordered the Governor of Virginia to deliver his demand to the Major General of New France in the capital, Quebec City.

During his stay, Washington noted that the fort had one hundred men, numerous officers, and birch canoes and 70 pine canoes, many unfinished. He described the fort as on a south or west fork of French Creek, near the water, and almost surrounded by it. Four houses composed the sides. The bastions were made of piles driven into the ground, standing more than 12 feet (3.7 m) high, and sharpened at the top. Port holes for cannon and loop-holes for small-arms were cut into the bastions. Each bastion mounted eight six-pound cannon and one four-pound cannon guarded the gate. Inside the bastions stood a guard-house, chapel, doctor's lodging and the commander's private stores. Outside the fort were several log barracks, some covered with bark, others with boards. In addition, there were stables, a smithy and other buildings.

=== French and Indian War ===
The French and Indian War began in North America on 28 May 1754 with the Battle of Jumonville Glen. (It was the regional front of the Seven Years' War between Britain and France in Europe.) Some four years later, on 25 July 1759, the French surrendered Fort Niagara to the British.

During August 1759, the commander of Fort Presque Isle sent an order to Fort Le Boeuf and Fort Machault for the officers and troops to abandon their positions and move north. Before they left, they burned the forts to make them unavailable to the British. The British rebuilt these forts and gave them British names, as they renamed the former Fort Duquesne at the Forks of the Ohio as Fort Pitt.

=== Destruction ===
During Pontiac's Rebellion, on 18 June 1763, a war party of Native Americans burned Fort Le Boeuf. The survivors escaped to Fort Venango (formerly Fort Machault), but it too was burned, so they continued to Fort Pitt.

When Judge Vincent settled in Waterford during 1797, he wrote, "There are no remains of the old French fort excepting the traces on the ground..."

== Sources ==
- "The Journal of Major George Washington, of His Journey to the French Forces on Ohio," George Washington, 1754.
- "The Frontier Forts of Western Pennsylvania," Albert, George Dallas, C. M. Busch, state printer, Harrisburg, 1896. Sketch of the site on pg. 556a shows Fort Le Boeuf at the intersection of Water Street and High Street (present-day Route 97). Caption reads, "Fort Le Boeuf built by the French in 1753 Burned in 1763." Description of fort by Washington, pg. 572. Descriptions of the fort, pgs. 566 - 581.
- Stotz, Charles Morse (2005). Outposts Of The War For Empire: The French And English In Western Pennsylvania: Their Armies, Their Forts, Their People 1749-1764. Pittsburgh: University of Pittsburgh Press. ISBN 0-8229-4262-3.
