= Venango, Pennsylvania =

Borough in Pennsylvania, US

- Borough
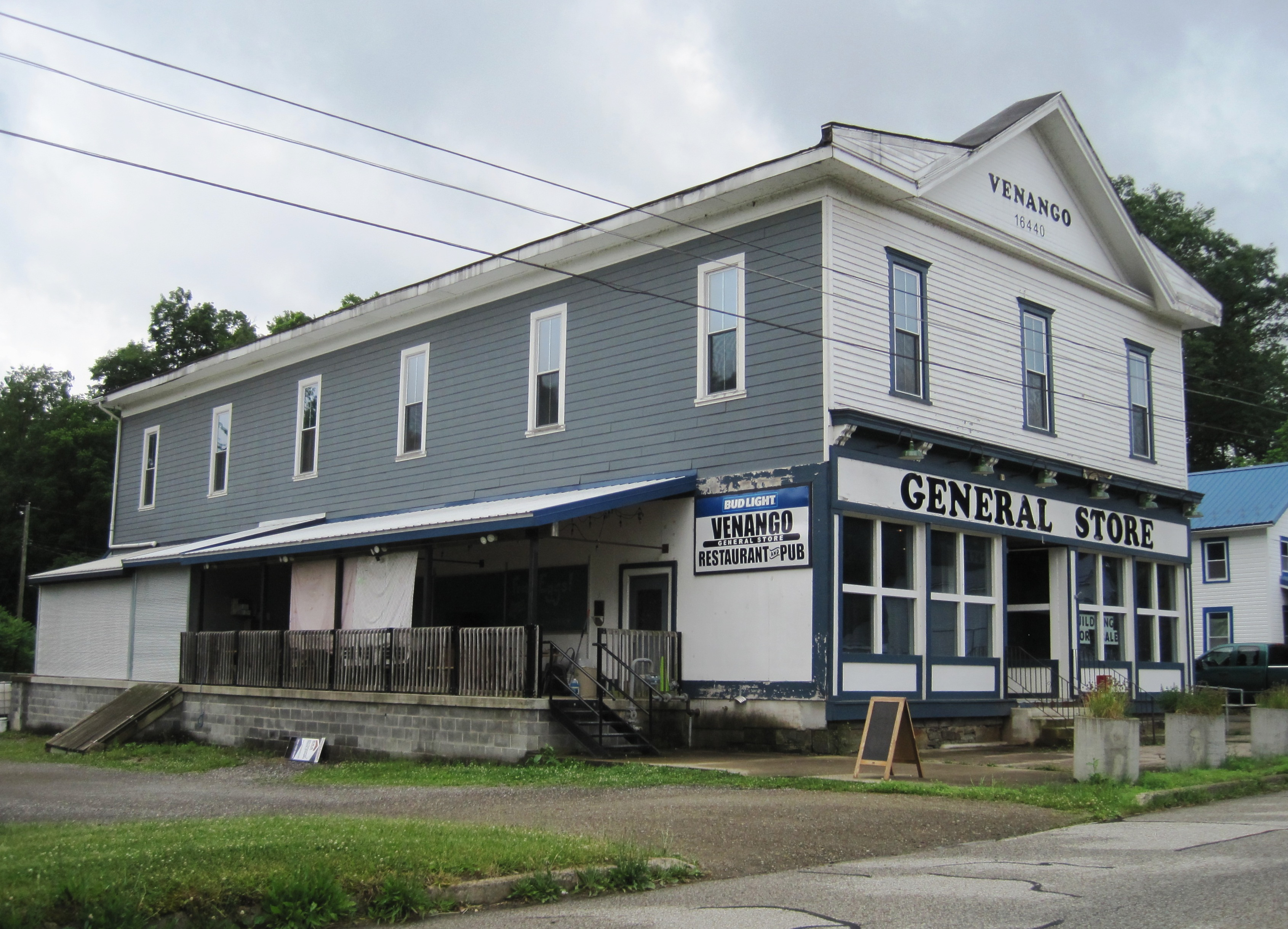
- Venango General Store

- Location of Venango in Crawford County, Pennsylvania.

- Location of Venango in Pennsylvania
- Coordinates: 41°46′22″N 80°6′39″W
- Country: United States
- State: Pennsylvania
- County: Crawford
- Founded: 1838

Area
  - Total: 0.27 sq mi (0.71 km^{2})
  - Land: 0.27 sq mi (0.71 km^{2})
  - Water: 0 sq mi (0.00 km^{2})
- Elevation (middle of borough): 1,145 ft (349 m)
- Highest elevation (west side of borough): 1,160 ft (350 m)
- Lowest elevation (French Creek): 1,130 ft (340 m)

Population (2020)
  - Total: 210
  - Estimate (2022): 207
  - Density: 907/sq mi (350.1/km^{2})
- Time zone: UTC-5 (EST)
  - Summer (DST): UTC-4 (EDT)
- Area code: 814
- FIPS code: 42-79912

Venango is a borough in Crawford County, Pennsylvania, United States. The population was 210 at the 2020 census, down from 239 at the 2010 census, down from 288 in 2000.

== Geography ==
Venango is located in north-central Crawford County at 41°46′22″N 80°6′39″W (41.772815, -80.110813). It is bordered by Venango Township to the north, west, and south, and by Cambridge Township to the east, across French Creek.

According to the United States Census Bureau, the borough has a total area of 0.27 square miles (0.71 km^{2}), all land.

Venango is located on conjoined U.S. Route 6 and U.S. Route 19, with Cambridge Springs 4 miles (6 km) to the northeast and Meadville, the county seat, 10 miles (16 km) to the south. Interstate 79 passes 2 miles (3 km) to the west of Venango, but without any nearby exits.

== Demographics ==
Historical population
Census	Pop.	Note	%±
1870	318		—
1880	347		9.1%
1890	278		−19.9%
1900	233		−16.2%
1910	251		7.7%
1920	237		−5.6%
1930	235		−0.8%
1940	300		27.7%
1950	359		19.7%
1960	318		−11.4%
1970	274		−13.8%
1980	298		8.8%
1990	289		−3.0%
2000	288		−0.3%
2010	239		−17.0%
2020	212		−11.3%
2022 (est.)	207	▼	−2.4%

As of the census of 2000, there were 288 people, 104 households, and 79 families residing in the borough. The population density was 1,089.7 inhabitants per square mile (420.7/km^{2}). There were 112 housing units at an average density of 423.8 per square mile (163.6/km^{2}). The racial makeup of the borough was 96.53% White, 2.43% African American, and 1.04% from two or more races. Hispanic or Latino of any race were 1.04% of the population.

There were 104 households, out of which 36.5% had children under the age of 18 living with them, 60.6% were married couples living together, 12.5% had a female householder with no husband present, and 24.0% were non-families. 17.3% of all households were made up of individuals, and 6.7% had someone living alone who was 65 years of age or older. The average household size was 2.77 and the average family size was 3.11.

In the borough the population was spread out, with 25.3% under the age of 18, 11.5% from 18 to 24, 28.8% from 25 to 44, 21.2% from 45 to 64, and 13.2% who were 65 years of age or older. The median age was 34 years. For every 100 females there were 110.2 males. For every 100 females age 18 and over, there were 106.7 males.

The median income for a household in the borough was $35,250, and the median income for a family was $38,125. Males had a median income of $27,250 versus $21,563 for females. The per capita income for the borough was $15,978. About 3.5% of families and 7.6% of the population were below the poverty line, including 4.8% of those under the age of eighteen and 7.7% of those sixty five or over.
