= James Craik (disambiguation) =

James Craik (1727–1814) was Physician General (precursor of the Surgeon General) of the United States Army. It may also refer to the following people:

- James Craik (curler) (born 2001), Scottish curler
- James Craik (moderator) (1801–1870), Scottish minister
- James Craik (priest) (1806–1882), noted preacher, author, lawyer, and amateur architect
