= George Washington's relations with the Haudenosaunee Confederacy =

Relations in the 18th century North America

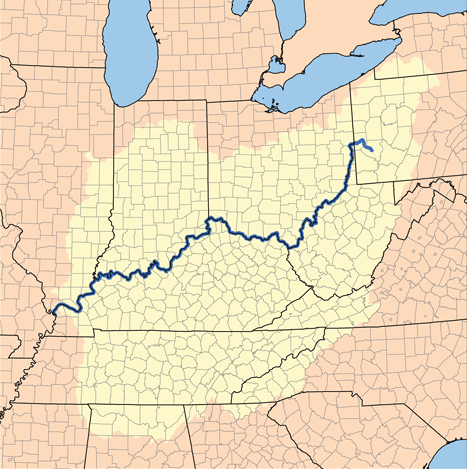
Image of the Ohio River, a region historically inhabited by various Native American tribes.

George Washington met with Native American tribal leaders multiple times throughout his life, both during his service as a British officer and later as a leader in the emerging United States. His interactions with Indigenous nations were particularly significant in the context of the contested Ohio River Valley. In 1753, during the lead-up to the French and Indian War, Washington was sent as a British emissary to the Haudenosaunee Confederacy and to deliver a message to French forces demanding their withdrawal from territory claimed by Britain.

In 1770, during the period between the French and Indian War and the American Revolutionary War, Washington traveled to the Ohio River Valley and met with Native American leaders to discuss land and settlement. These meetings were part of broader colonial interests in expanding westward, often at odds with Native American sovereignty and territorial claims.

During and after the Revolutionary War, Washington and his administration continued to engage in diplomacy with Indigenous nations. These interactions were part of the early formation of U.S. Native American policy, which attempted to address ongoing conflicts between settlers and Native peoples, though often through treaties that resulted in land loss for tribes.

The Ohio River Valley, which follows the Ohio River and spans parts of present-day New York, Pennsylvania, Maryland, West Virginia, Kentucky, Ohio, Indiana, and Illinois, was a region of strategic and economic importance. In the mid-18th century, it was claimed by both France and Britain, as well as by numerous Native American nations. Tensions over control of the region contributed directly to the outbreak of the French and Indian War in 1754.

During the Revolutionary War, the Ohio Valley became a contested frontier zone. The Haudenosaunee Confederacy experienced internal divisions, sometimes referred to as an "Iroquois Civil War," with nations such as the Seneca and Mohawk siding with the British, while others, including the Oneida and Tuscarora, allied with the American revolutionaries. Some other groups, such as the Lenape (Delaware), also became involved, with alliances often influenced by shifting local dynamics and survival strategies in the face of war and encroachment.

== Notable visits with Washington ==
- 1753 Washington makes his first expedition into the Ohio River Valley as a British Colonial Aide
- 1770 Washington Visits with Guyasuta on the Ohio River
- 1775 Visit to Washington by Oneidas and Samuel Kirkland in Boston Camp
- 1777 Visit to Washington by Oneidas and Kirkland in Morristown, New Jersey
- 1779 Visit to Washington by Lenape (Delaware Tribe) in Middlebrook, New Jersey
- 1793 As U.S. president, Washington meets several times with tribal leaders in the President's House, his home in Philadelphia

== Washington's first expedition into the Ohio Valley ==
While George Washington had interacted with Native Americans during his early life in Virginia, his first official diplomatic engagement with tribal leaders occurred in 1753. At the time, Washington was commissioned by the British colonial government to deliver a message to French forces encroaching on land claimed by Britain in the Ohio River Valley. As part of this mission, he met with several Native American leaders at the village of Logstown, including a Seneca chief known as Tanacharison, referred to by the British as the "Half King."

Washington's expedition to the French strongholds included notable companions such as Christopher Gist, Jacob Van Braam, four porters, and three Native American leaders—Tanacharison (Half King), Jesakake, and White Thunder—as well as their hunter. The group visited the Native village of Venango in an attempt to persuade local tribes to align with the British cause.

Ultimately, Washington's mission failed to convince the French and their Native allies to withdraw from the contested region. Contemporary accounts suggest that Washington was inexperienced in Indigenous diplomacy and often failed to fully grasp Native customs and concerns. Despite this, he continued diplomatic engagement with Native leaders. With guidance from Tanacharison and other Indigenous intermediaries, Washington helped negotiate British alliances with the Lenape and Shawnee tribes.

During this time, Tanacharison gave Washington the name Caunotaucarius, which translates to "Town Taker" or "Town Destroyer"—a name later used by various Native groups in their political dealings with him.

The French and Indian War (1754–1763) was sparked in part by Washington's 1754 ambush of a French party led by Joseph Coulon de Jumonville, an event reportedly encouraged by Tanacharison. The incident escalated tensions and is considered one of the triggers of the wider conflict. Some historians suggest that Tanacharison may have manipulated Washington to provoke conflict, though Tanacharison died shortly after the engagement due to illness.

Washington's experiences during the French and Indian War helped shape his understanding of Native diplomacy and warfare. By the time he returned to the Ohio Valley in 1770, he was reportedly more adept at navigating Haudenosaunee customs and political dynamics.

== Ohio River visits after the French and Indian War ==
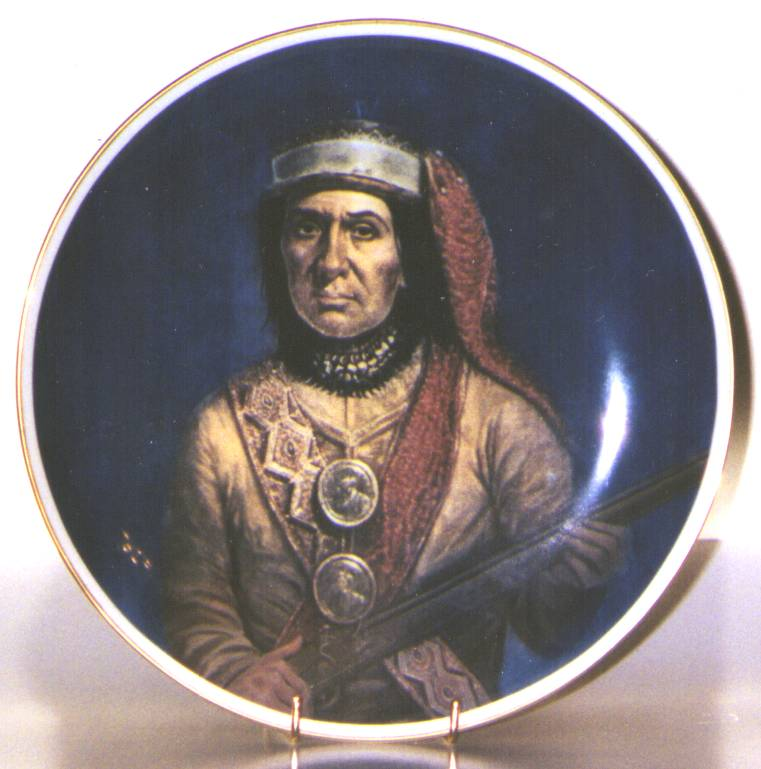
Image of Guyasuta

After the French and Indian War, in the fall of 1770, George Washington, his friend Dr. James Craik, and several servants traveled west to inspect lands Washington had received as a reward for his military service during the war. Washington regarded these lands as valuable for agriculture and for natural resources such as coal. During this journey, he also renewed ties with Native Americans he had previously encountered.

Washington received a message from the chiefs of the Conoy (also called Conengayote) and other Haudenosaunee groups. Some of the chiefs remembered Washington from his 1753 expedition, while others had only heard of him. Washington and Dr. Craik traveled again to meet with the Conoy but also embarked on a canoe trip along the Ohio River accompanied by an interpreter, a Native guide, and a warrior. Along the way, they visited multiple Native American villages. During this time, there were rumors that Native Americans had killed two traders farther down the river. They also observed a group of about sixty Native Americans setting out on a raid against the Catawba. Later, near the mouth of the Kanawha River, Washington's group encountered another Native hunting party.

Washington recognized the leader of this party as Guyasuta, a Seneca leader who had accompanied him in 1753. By 1770, Guyasuta was a prominent chief among the Six Nations, having fought in both the French and Indian War and Pontiac's Rebellion. Although Washington was now known as a seasoned military leader who had fought in the Ohio Country and against various Native American groups, Guyasuta welcomed him. He and his party joined Washington's group and shared buffalo meat with them.

The following morning, Guyasuta told Washington that many Native Americans were eager to resume trade with Virginia and asked Washington to inform the colonial governor of their friendly intentions toward white settlers.

On the return trip, Washington once again encountered Guyasuta and his hunting camp. He was welcomed with hospitality and invited to participate in Native ceremonies. Washington and Guyasuta discussed the location of fertile lands suitable for plantation agriculture. On November 17, Washington's group stopped in Mingo Town, where Washington took the opportunity to record detailed observations about the Native American settlements along the Ohio River. He noted that Native families hunted together and moved their camps according to the availability of game. He also remarked that many of the Native people living along the river were wary and distrustful of white settlers, whom they viewed with increasing unease and jealousy.

== Revolutionary Indian affairs ==
During the American Revolution, George Washington was among the most experienced Patriot leaders involved in diplomatic efforts with Native American tribes in the Ohio River Valley. At the time, the Haudenosaunee Confederacy was fractured: the Seneca and Mohawk allied with the British, while the Oneida and Tuscarora showed inclinations to support the Patriot cause.

In 1775, the Continental Congress expressed concern over British efforts to forge alliances with the Haudenosaunee Confederacy in the Ohio River Valley. Reports indicated the presence of British agents—many of whom were Loyalist colonists—in the region, and that it was serving as a refuge for deserters and draft dodgers. To address this, Congress established three committees to negotiate with various tribes and, by 1776, had appropriated $30,000 for tribal diplomacy, including gifts and travel expenses.

Washington was tasked with facilitating a military alliance with the Oneida and Tuscarora tribes—members of the Haudenosaunee Confederacy who had not joined the British. Recalling his earlier experiences alongside Native leaders such as the Seneca chief Tanacharison, Washington advocated for joint military operations between colonial troops and Native allies. He wrote: "Such a body of Indians, joined by some of our woodsmen, would probably strike no small terror into the British and foreign troops, particularly the newcomers."

In 1777, Washington met with an Oneida chief and missionary Reverend Samuel Kirkland at his headquarters in Morristown, New Jersey. During this meeting, the Oneida formally declared their alliance with the Patriots. They later participated in the Battle of Oriskany, where they fought against Loyalist forces supported by the Seneca and Mohawk. The Oneida continued to support the Patriot cause throughout the war, particularly in engagements along the western frontier.

In response to a series of raids by Loyalist and Haudenosaunee forces on settlements in New York and Pennsylvania, Congress ordered a retaliatory campaign. In 1778, Washington assigned Major General John Sullivan to lead an expedition aimed at dismantling the military capabilities of the Haudenosaunee nations allied with the British. Washington instructed Sullivan to “lay waste all the settlements around…in the most effectual manner, that the country may not be merely overrun, but destroyed.”

Known as the Sullivan–Clinton Campaign, the operation encountered less resistance than anticipated. Discipline among Patriot troops deteriorated, and widespread destruction followed. Approximately sixty Haudenosaunee towns were destroyed—ranging from larger settlements to small agricultural communities.

== Post-Revolution relations ==
After the American Revolution, settlers began to expand into the Ohio River Valley and other Native American territories. The United States Congress maintained that because the Haudenosaunee Confederacy had allied with the British during the war, they had forfeited claims to their western lands, even though not all Haudenosaunee nations had supported the Loyalist cause.

In 1787, the Confederation Congress passed the Northwest Ordinance, which officially opened the Ohio River Valley to American settlement. The ordinance stated that “(Indian) land shall never be taken from them without their consent… they never shall be invaded or disturbed.” However, the federal government lacked the capacity to enforce these protections, and unauthorized seizures of Native land continued.

Henry Knox, Secretary of War under President George Washington, expressed concern that continued violations of Native sovereignty could provoke a new Native coalition. He warned that such an alliance might seek support from Spain, which still held territories to the south.

Seneca leaders wrote to Washington to protest land seizures that, they argued, violated the Treaty of Fort Stanwix (1784), which had already ceded significant portions of Seneca territory in exchange for protection of their remaining lands.

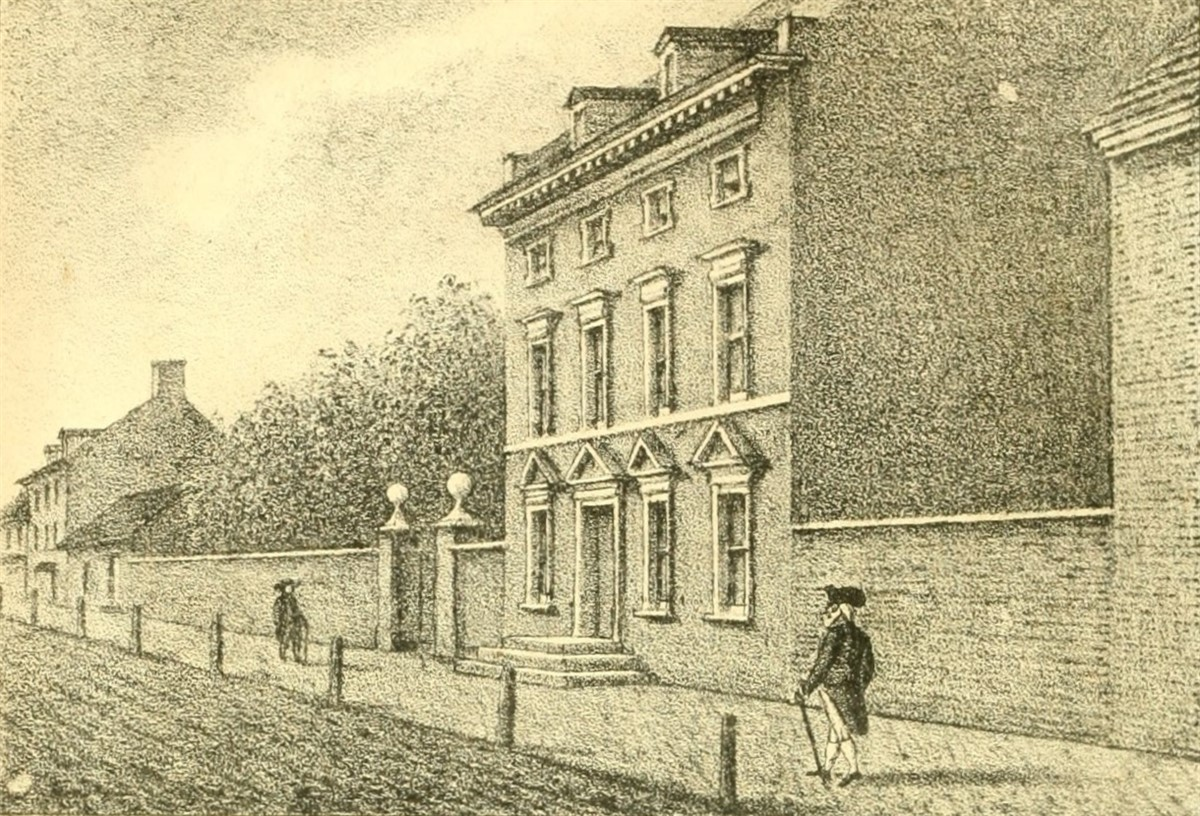
The President's House, Washington's Philadelphia residence where diplomatic dinners took place.

On February 4, 1793, President Washington hosted a diplomatic dinner at his residence on Market Street in Philadelphia. Attendees included Thomas Jefferson, Henry Knox, Edmund Randolph, and eight Native American delegates—six men and two women—accompanied by interpreters. These delegates represented the Piankashaw, Peoria, Potawatomi, Kaskaskia, and Mascouten nations. Prior to the dinner, they prepared speeches, wampum belts, and a ceremonial calumet (pipe of peace).

A week later, on February 11, Washington hosted another dinner, this time with representatives from the six nations of the Haudenosaunee Confederacy. During the gathering, Washington thanked the Haudenosaunee delegates for helping to disseminate diplomatic messages to other tribes in the West. These meetings were temporarily suspended during the yellow fever outbreak in Philadelphia, when much of the city's population fled.

On June 14, 1794, Washington hosted another diplomatic dinner, this time with thirteen Cherokee leaders. The Cherokee chiefs delivered formal speeches, and the event included ceremonial drinking and pipe-smoking. A month later, Washington met with a delegation of Chickasaw leaders, seeking their assistance as scouts in operations against tribes located north of the Ohio River. These dinners were a regular feature of Washington's presidency and reflected ongoing attempts to maintain diplomatic relations with Native nations.

== Changes in Indian policy ==
To maintain order between Native Americans and settlers, several treaties were established to define territorial boundaries. However, these agreements were frequently violated by settlers, often leading to violent conflict. After the American Revolutionary War, hostilities between Native peoples and American settlers increased significantly.

In an attempt to reduce this violence and centralize control over Native affairs, President George Washington and Secretary of War Henry Knox advocated for legislation that would restrict negotiations and land purchases to the federal government. This resulted in the passage of the First Trade and Intercourse Act in 1790, which established federal authority as the sole mediator in Indian affairs. One of the stated aims of this policy was to encourage the assimilation of Native Americans into American agrarian society. The government attempted to support this effort by offering domesticated animals, farming tools, and other resources to Native communities.

In 1808, President Thomas Jefferson advised southern Native leaders that their communities should adopt agriculture and sedentary land use, with the hope that such practices would integrate them into the American economy and society.

Some of these so-called humanitarian policies—such as missionary outreach and the provision of agricultural tools—were also used to justify the acquisition of Native lands. Many white settlers and policymakers embraced the belief that American expansion was inevitable and that Native peoples would either assimilate or be displaced in the process.
