= James Craik (priest) =

American architect

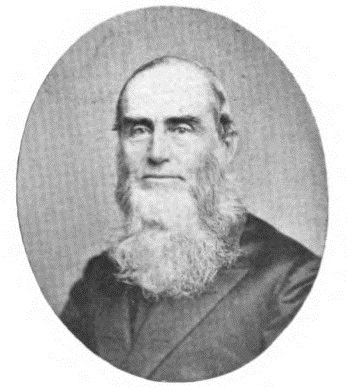
Rev. James Craik

James Craik (31 August 1806 – 9 June 1882) was a noted preacher, author, lawyer, and amateur architect. He was born on August 31, 1806, in Alexandria, Virginia, to George Washington Craik, secretary to President George Washington during his second term, and Maria Tucker. He was the grandson of Dr. James Craik, President George Washington's physician. He married Juliet Shrewsbury and had eleven children.

== Law practice ==
He studied medicine briefly at Transylvania College before switching to law with the encouragement of the college president, Dr. Holley. and practiced law in Charleston, WV, where he built Elm Grove, now called the Craik-Patton House. Along with his law partner Ezra Walker, who was also the editor of the “Kanawha Banner” newspaper, Craik would argue cases in the counties of Kanawha, Logan, Mason, and Cabell. Craik lived in a portion of land, five hundred acres, inherited from his grandfather briefly while Elm Grove was under construction. It was during Craik's ten years of practicing law and studying theology that he eventually decided to do church work.

== Priestly duties and written works ==
Craik became a deacon of the Episcopal church in 1839. He became a priest at St. John's Church in Charleston, WV, in 1841. In 1844 he moved to Louisville, Ky to serve at Christ Church. He sold his property in Charleston to local lawyer, Isaac Read. While living in Louisville he built another house this one he sentimentally named "Kanawha" after the valley in which Elm Grove was located. He and his family moved into this house in early 1850.

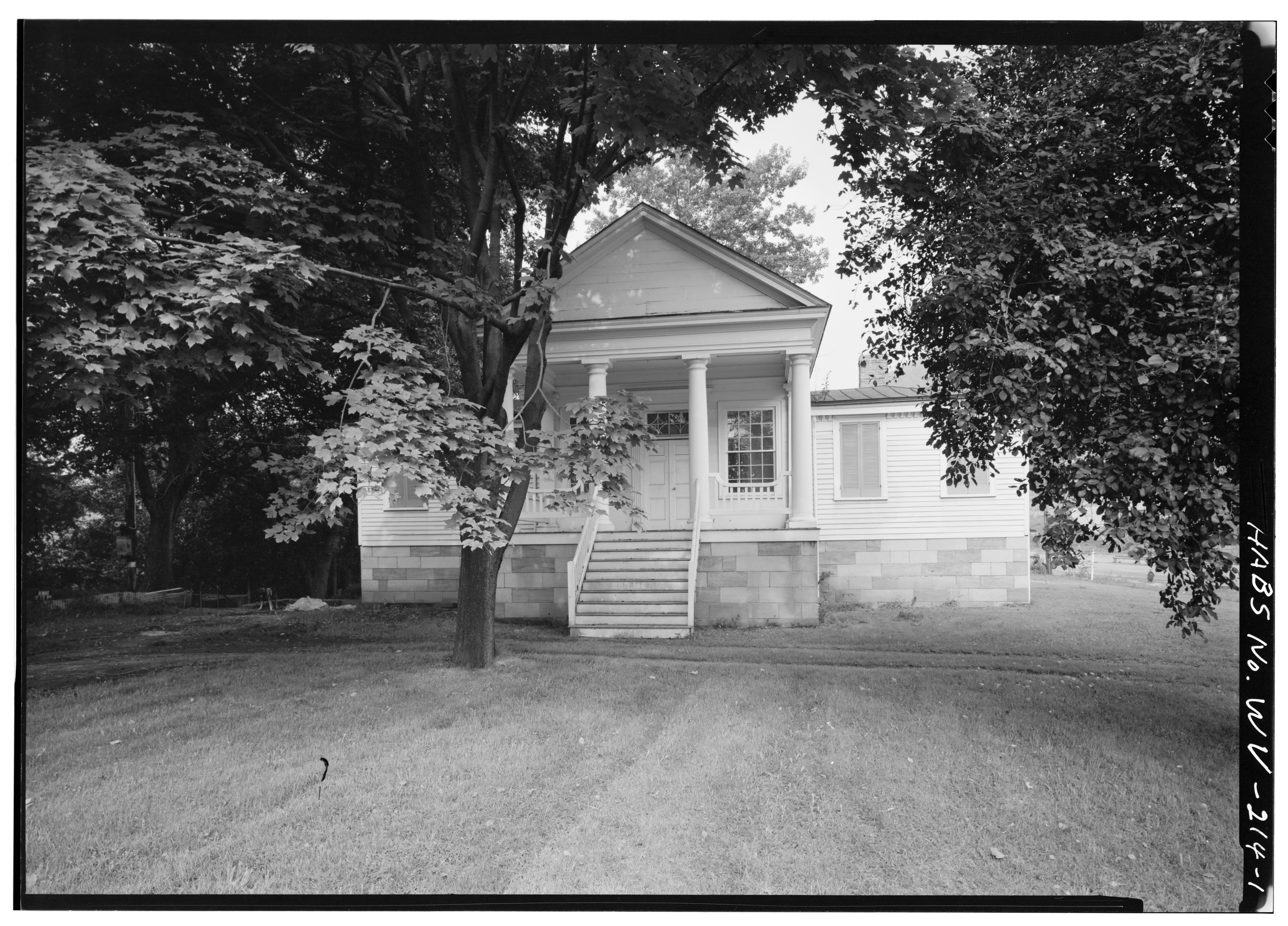
James Craik's home in Charleston, WV. Elm Grove which he built in 1834 and lived in until 1844.

Craik wrote extensively on theology. His two best remembered works are Old and New and The Divine Life. In addition to these works being used as textbooks for church schools he was also widely renowned as a preacher. He was a founder of the Orphanage of the Good Shepherd. He held the position of President of the House of Deputies of the General Convention in the Episcopal Church from 1862 to 1874 in addition to his responsibilities within his own diocese. He was noted to have been involved in a number of charities and to have had a great appreciation for devotional music.

On June 27, 2024 the House of Deputies of the 81st General Convention of The Episcopal Church passed, by acclamation, D074 Renouncing the Theology of Slavery held by the Rev. James Craik, 11th President of the House of Deputies.

== Later years and death ==
In his waning years he spoke before the Kentucky Legislature in favor of staying in the Union. He remained serving Christ Church at Louisville, Ky until he died on June 9, 1882, from illness. After his passing one of his sons, Charles, took over his position at Christ Church.
