= Military career of George Washington =

George Washington
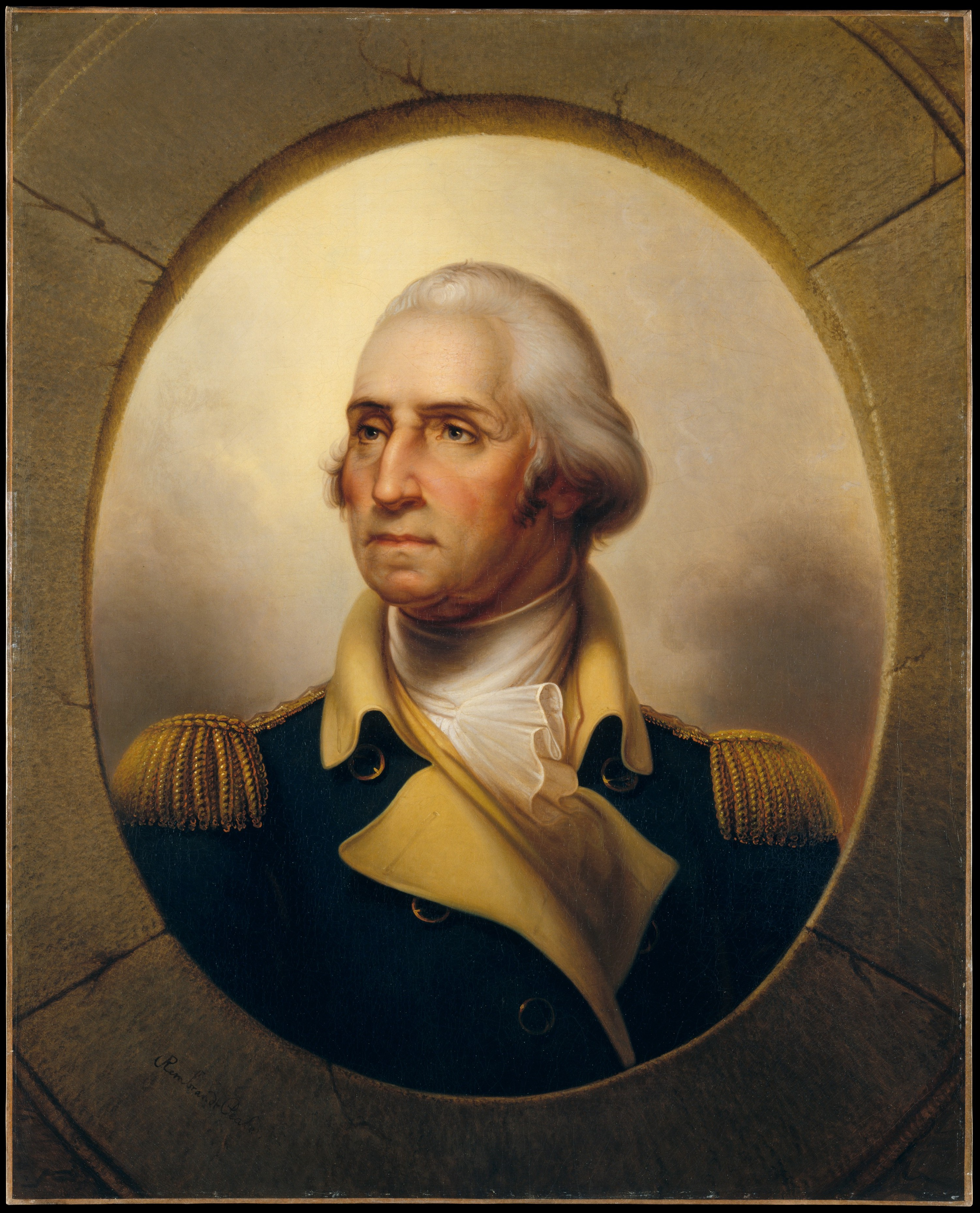
- Portrait by Rembrandt Peale, c. 1846
- Born: February 22, 1732; Popes Creek, Colony of Virginia, British America
- Died: December 14, 1799 (aged 67); Mount Vernon, Virginia, U.S.
- Spouse: Martha Dandridge Custis (m. 1759)
- Military career
- Allegiance: Great Britain; United States
- Branch: Virginia Militia; Continental Army; United States Army
- Service years: 1752–1758 (Virginia Militia); 1775–1783 (Continental Army); 1798–1799 (U.S. Army)
- Rank: Colonel (1st Virginia Regiment); Colonel (Virginia Militia); General and Commander-in-Chief (Continental Army); Lieutenant general (U.S. Army); General of the Armies (appointed posthumously)
- Commands: Virginia Regiment; Continental Army; United States Army
- Conflicts: See list: French and Indian War; Battle of Jumonville Glen; Battle of Fort Necessity; Braddock Expedition; Battle of the Monongahela; Forbes Expedition; American Revolutionary War; Boston campaign; Siege of Boston; New York and New Jersey campaign; Battle of Long Island; Landing at Kip's Bay; Battle of Harlem Heights; Battle of White Plains; Battle of Fort Washington; Battle of Fort Lee; Battle of Trenton; Battle of the Assunpink Creek; Battle of Princeton; Philadelphia campaign; Battle of Brandywine; Battle of the Clouds; Battle of Germantown; Battle of White Marsh; Battle of Monmouth; Yorktown campaign; Siege of Yorktown; American Indian Wars; Northwest Indian War; Whiskey Rebellion
- Awards: Congressional Gold Medal; Thanks of Congress

The military career of George Washington spanned over forty-five years of service (1752–1799). Washington's service can be broken into three periods, French and Indian War, American Revolutionary War, and the Quasi-War with France, with service in three different armed forces: British provincial militia, the Continental Army, and the United States Army.

Because of Washington's importance in the early History of the United States, he was granted a posthumous promotion to General of the Armies of the United States, legislatively defined to be the highest possible rank in the US Army, more than 175 years after his death.

== French and Indian War service ==
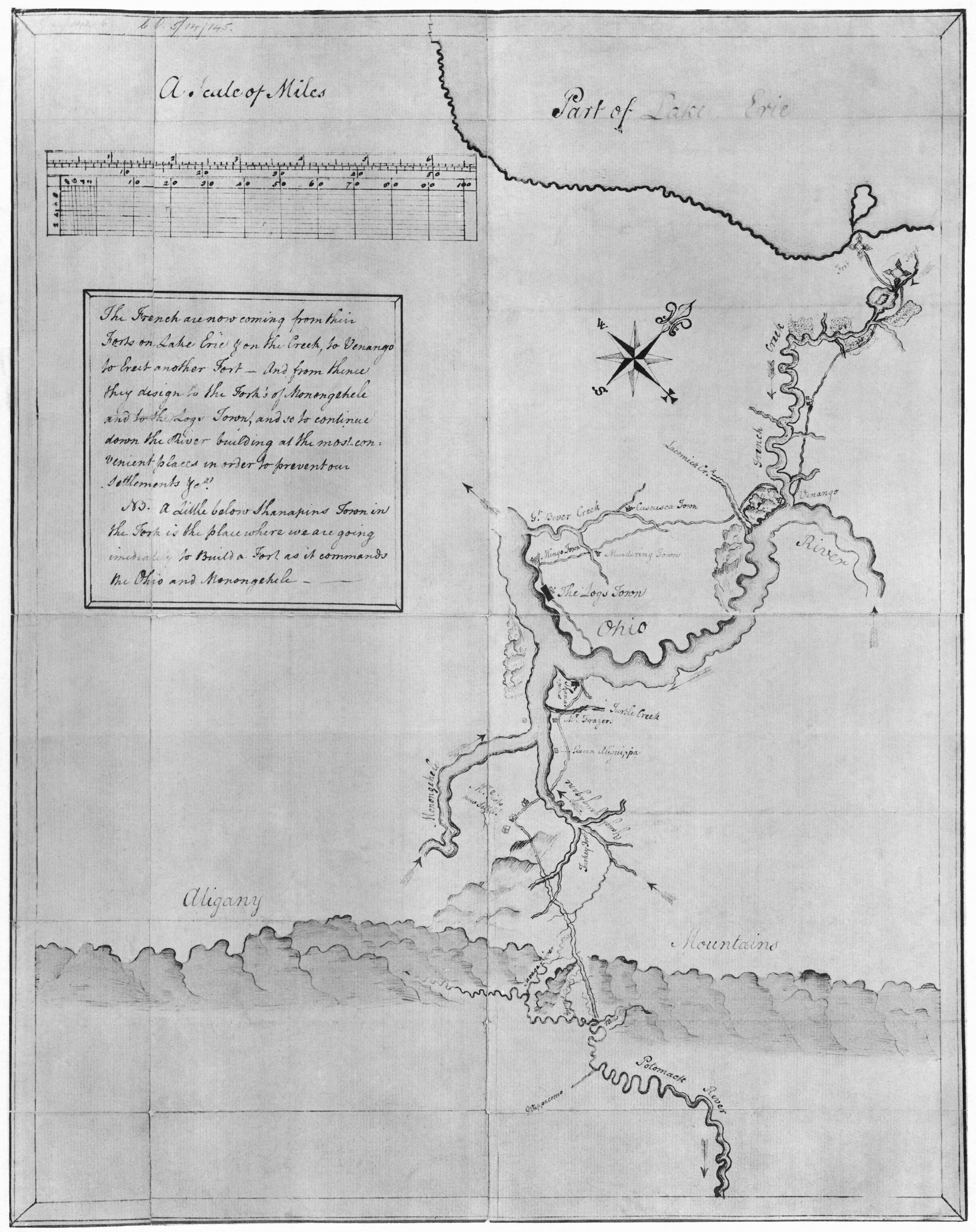
Washington's 1754 map showing Ohio River and surrounding region

Virginia's Royal Governor, Robert Dinwiddie, appointed Washington a major in the provincial militia in February 1753. In that year the French began expanding their military control into the "Ohio Country", a territory also claimed by the British colonies of Virginia and Pennsylvania. These competing claims led to a world war 1756–63 (called the French and Indian War in the colonies and the Seven Years' War in Europe) and Washington was at the center of its beginning. The Ohio Company was one vehicle through which Anglo-American investors planned to expand into the territory, opening new settlements and building trading posts for the Indian trade. Governor Dinwiddie received orders from the British government to warn the French of British claims, and sent Major Washington in late 1753 to deliver a letter informing the French of those claims and asking them to leave. Washington also met with Tanacharison (also called "Half-King") and other Iroquois leaders allied to Virginia at Logstown to secure their support in case of conflict with the French; Washington and Half-King became friends and allies. Washington delivered the letter to the local French commander, who politely refused to leave.

Governor Dinwiddie sent Washington back to the Ohio Country to protect an Ohio Company group building a fort at present-day Pittsburgh, Pennsylvania. Before he reached the area, a French force drove out the company's crew and began construction of Fort Duquesne. With Mingo allies led by Tanacharison, Washington and some of his militia unit ambushed a French scouting party of some 30 men, led by Joseph Coulon de Jumonville; Jumonville was killed, and there are contradictory accounts of his death. The French responded by attacking and capturing Washington at Fort Necessity in July 1754. He was allowed to return with his troops to Virginia. The experience demonstrated Washington's bravery, initiative, inexperience and impetuosity. These events had international consequences; the French accused Washington of assassinating Jumonville, who they claimed was on a diplomatic mission similar to Washington's 1753 mission. Both France and Britain responded by sending troops to North America in 1755, although war was not formally declared until 1756.

=== Braddock disaster 1755 ===
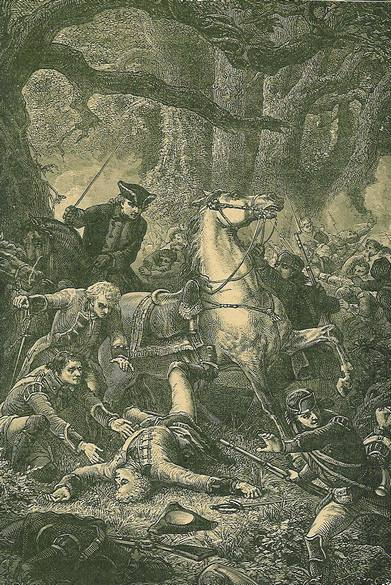
Major General Edward Braddock's death at the Battle of the Monongahela, on July 9, 1755

In 1755, Washington was the senior Colonial aide to General Edward Braddock on the ill-fated Braddock Expedition. This was at the time the largest ever British military expedition ventured into the colonies, and was intended to expel the French from the Ohio Country. The French and their Indian allies ambushed the expedition, mowing down over 900 casualties including the mortally wounded Braddock. During what became known as the Battle of the Monongahela, Braddock's troops retreated in disarray but Washington rode back and forth across the battlefield, rallying the remnants of the British column to an organized retreat.

=== Commander of Virginia Regiment ===
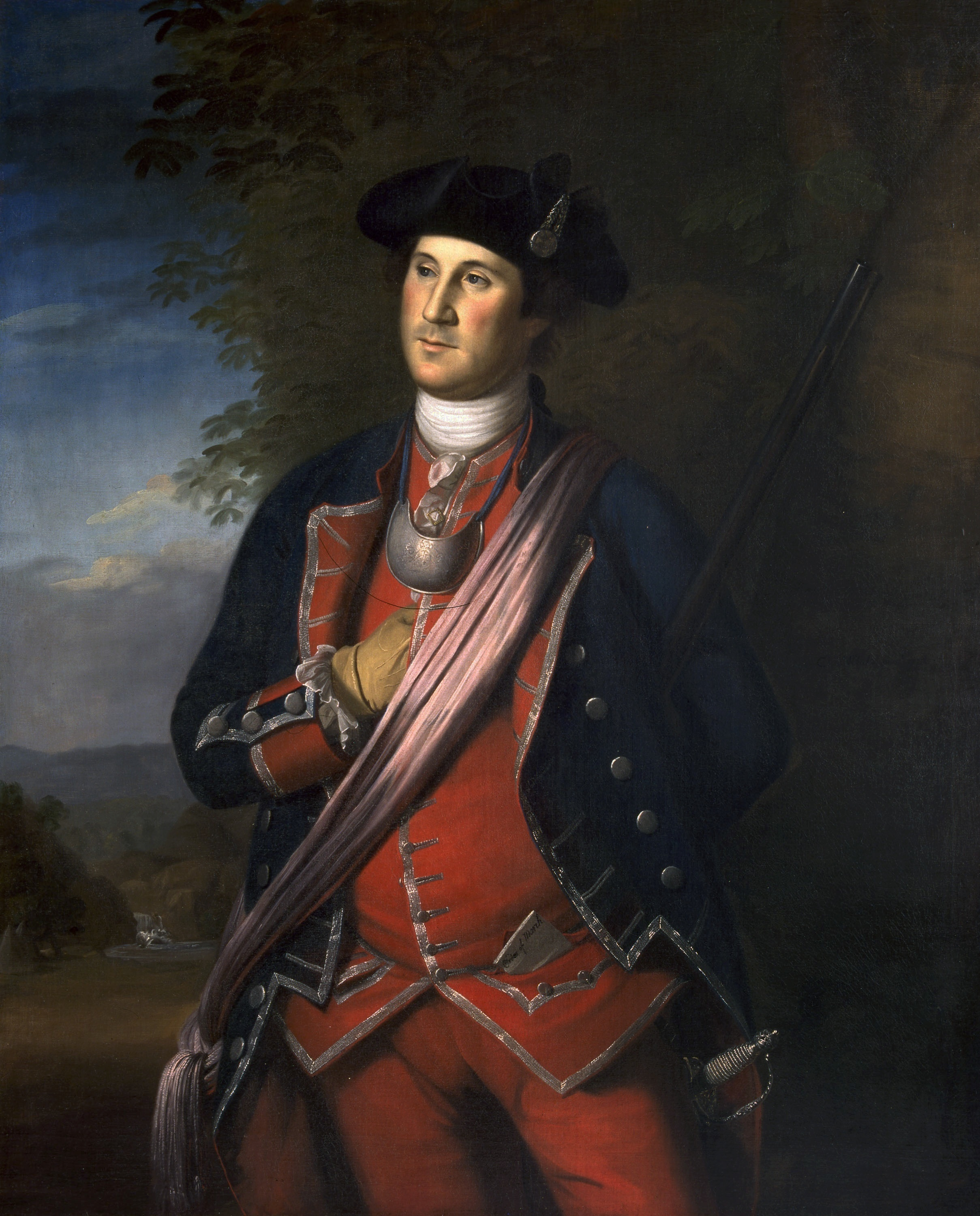
This 1772 portrait by Charles Willson Peale, depicting Washington as colonel of the Virginia Regiment, is his earliest known likeness

Governor Dinwiddie rewarded Washington in 1755 with a commission as "Colonel of the Virginia Regiment and Commander in Chief of all forces now raised in the defense of His Majesty's Colony" and gave him the task of defending Virginia's frontier. The Virginia Regiment was a provincial regiment, as opposed to part-time militias and regular British Army units. Washington was ordered to "act defensively or offensively" as he thought best. In command of a thousand soldiers, Washington was a disciplinarian who emphasized training. He led his men in grueling campaigns against the Indians in the west; in 10 months units of his regiment fought 20 battles, and lost a third of its men. Washington's strenuous efforts meant that Virginia's frontier population suffered less than that of other colonies; Ellis concludes "it was his only unqualified success" in the war.

In 1758, Washington participated in the Forbes Expedition to capture Fort Duquesne in Pittsburgh. He was embarrassed by a friendly fire episode in which his unit and another British unit thought the other was French and opened fire, leaving 14 dead and 26 wounded. There was ultimately no real fighting since the French abandoned the fort and the British scored a major strategic victory, gaining control of the Ohio Valley. Upon his return to Virginia, Washington resigned his commission in December 1758, and did not return to military life until the outbreak of the American Revolutionary War in 1775.

=== Lessons learned ===
Washington never gained the commission in the British army that he yearned for, but in these years he gained valuable military, political, and leadership skills, closely observing their tactics, gaining a keen insight into their strengths and weaknesses that proved invaluable during the Revolution. He learned the basics of battlefield tactics from his observations, readings, and conversations with professional officers, as well as a good understanding of problems of organization and logistics. He gained an understanding of overall strategy, especially in locating strategic geographical points. Washington too, learned to organize, train, and drill, and discipline his companies and regiments. He developed a very negative idea of the value of militia, who seemed too unreliable, too undisciplined, and too short-term compared to regulars. On the other hand, his experience was limited to command of about 1,000 men, and came only in remote frontier conditions.

Washington demonstrated his resourcefulness and courage in the most difficult situations, including disasters and retreats. He developed a command presence, given his size, strength, stamina, and bravery in battle, which demonstrated to soldiers that he was a natural leader whom they could follow without question. Washington's fortitude in his early years was sometimes manifested in less constructive ways. Biographer John R. Alden contends that Washington offered "fulsome and insincere flattery to British generals in vain attempts to win great favor" and on occasion showed youthful arrogance, as well as jealousy and ingratitude in the midst of impatience.

== American Revolutionary War service ==
Flag used as George Washington's personal standard, located in the American Revolution Museum

In June 1774, with political tensions rising in the colonies, Washington chaired a meeting in Fairfax County, Virginia, at which the Fairfax Resolves were adopted. The resolves called for convening a Continental Congress. In August, Washington attended the First Virginia Convention, where he was selected as a delegate to the First Continental Congress in Philadelphia. Tensions rose further in 1774, and he assisted in the training of county militias in Virginia and organized enforcement of the boycott of British goods instituted by the Congress.

=== Victory in Boston ===
After the Battles of Lexington and Concord near Boston in April 1775, the colonies went to war. Washington arrived at the Second Continental Congress in Philadelphia wearing a military uniform, signaling that he was prepared for war. Congress created the Continental Army on June 14, 1775. He was nominated by John Adams of Massachusetts, who chose him in part because he was a Virginian and would thus draw the southern colonies into the conflict. Congress appointed George Washington "General & Commander in chief of the army of the United Colonies and of all the forces raised or to be raised by them", and instructed him on June 22, 1775, to take charge of the siege of Boston. At that point, the prospect of victory seemed far-fetched, as such Washington was concerned about the reaction from his wife Martha and he did not write to let her know about his appointment until days later.

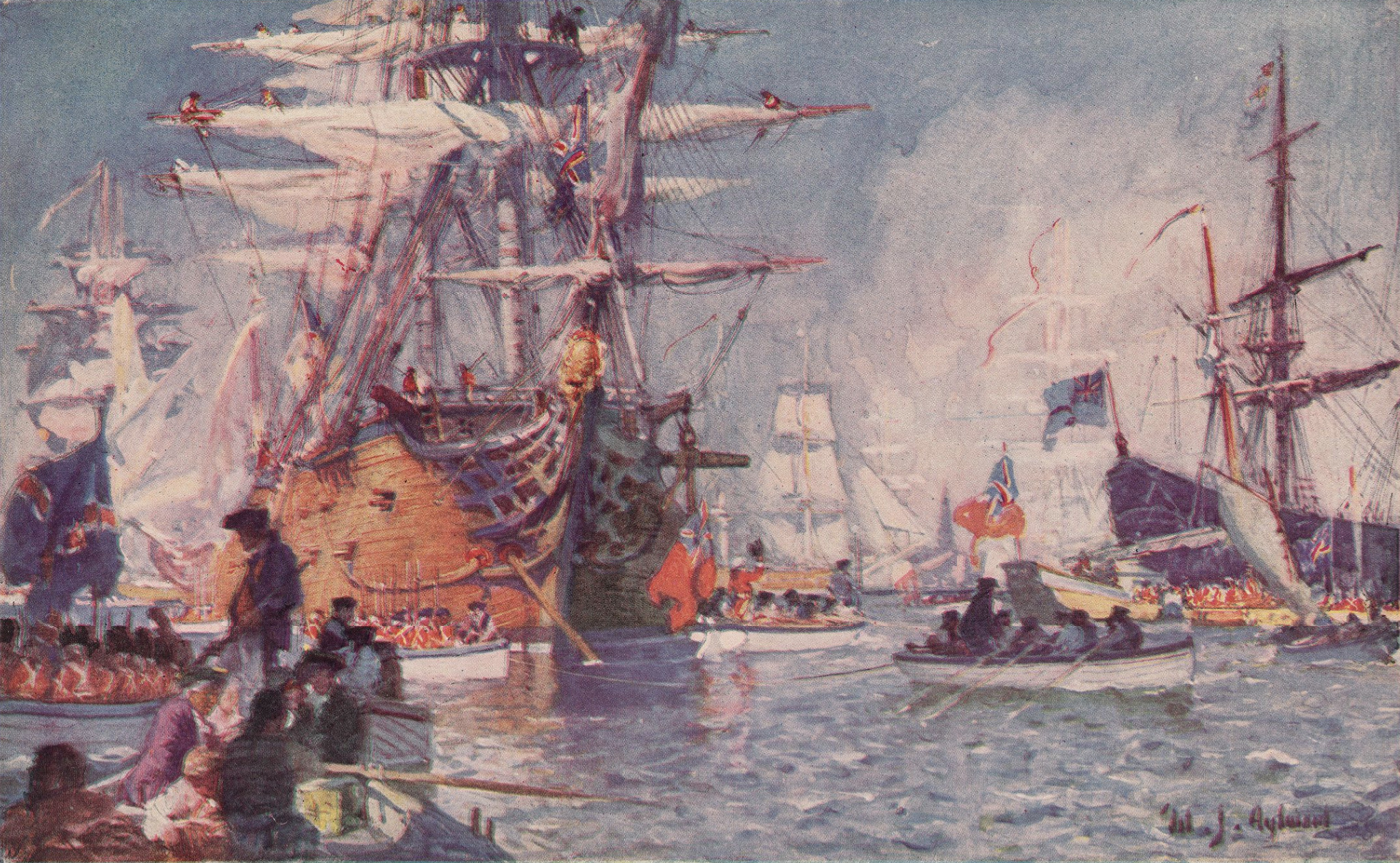
British forces evacuate the city at the end of the Siege of Boston

Washington assumed command of the colonial forces outside Boston on July 2, 1775, during the ongoing siege of Boston. His first steps were to establish procedures and to fashion what had begun as militia regiments into an effective fighting force.

When inventory returns exposed a dangerous shortage of gunpowder, Washington asked for new sources. British arsenals were raided and some manufacturing was attempted. A barely adequate supply of about 2.5 million pounds was obtained by the end of 1776, mostly from France. In search of heavy weapons, he sent Henry Knox on an expedition to Fort Ticonderoga to retrieve cannons that had been captured there. He resisted repeated calls from Congress to launch attacks against the British in Boston, calling war councils that supported the decisions against such action. Before the Continental Navy was established in November 1775 he, without Congressional authorization, began arming a "secret navy" to prey on poorly protected British transports and supply ships. When Congress authorized an invasion of Quebec, Washington authorized Benedict Arnold to lead a force from Cambridge to Quebec City through the wilderness of present-day Maine.

As the siege dragged on, the matter of expiring enlistments became a matter of serious concern. Washington tried to convince Congress that enlistments longer than one year were necessary to build an effective fighting force, but he was rebuffed in this effort. The 1776 establishment of the Continental Army only had enlistment terms of one year, a matter that would again be a problem in late 1776.

Washington finally forced the British to withdraw from Boston by putting Henry Knox's artillery on Dorchester Heights overlooking the city, and preparing in detail to attack the city from Cambridge if the British tried to assault the position. The British evacuated Boston and sailed away, although Washington did not know they were headed for Halifax, Nova Scotia. Believing they were headed for New York City, which was Major General William Howe's eventual destination, Washington rushed most of the army there.

=== Defeated at New York City ===
Washington's success in Boston was not repeated in New York. Recognizing the city's importance as a naval base and gateway to the Hudson River, he delegated the task of fortifying New York to Charles Lee in February 1776. Despite the city's poor defensibility, Congress insisted that Washington defend it. The faltering military campaign in Quebec also led to calls for additional troops there, and Washington detached six regiments northward under John Sullivan in April.

Washington had to deal with his first major command controversy while in New York, which was partially a product of regional friction. New England troops serving in northern New York under General Philip Schuyler, a scion of an old patroon family of New York, objected to his aristocratic style, and their Congressional representatives lobbied Washington to replace Schuyler with Horatio Gates. Washington tried to quash the issue by giving Gates command of the forces in Quebec, but the collapse of the Quebec expedition brought renewed complaints. Despite Gates' experience, Washington personally preferred Schuyler, and put Gates in a role subordinate to Schuyler. The episode exposed Washington to Gates' desire for advancement, possibly at his expense, and to the latter's influence in Congress.

General Howe's army, reinforced by thousands of additional troops from Europe and a fleet under the command of his brother, Admiral Richard Howe, began arriving off New York in early July, and made an unopposed landing on Staten Island. Without intelligence about Howe's intentions, Washington was forced to divide his still poorly trained forces, principally between Manhattan and Long Island.

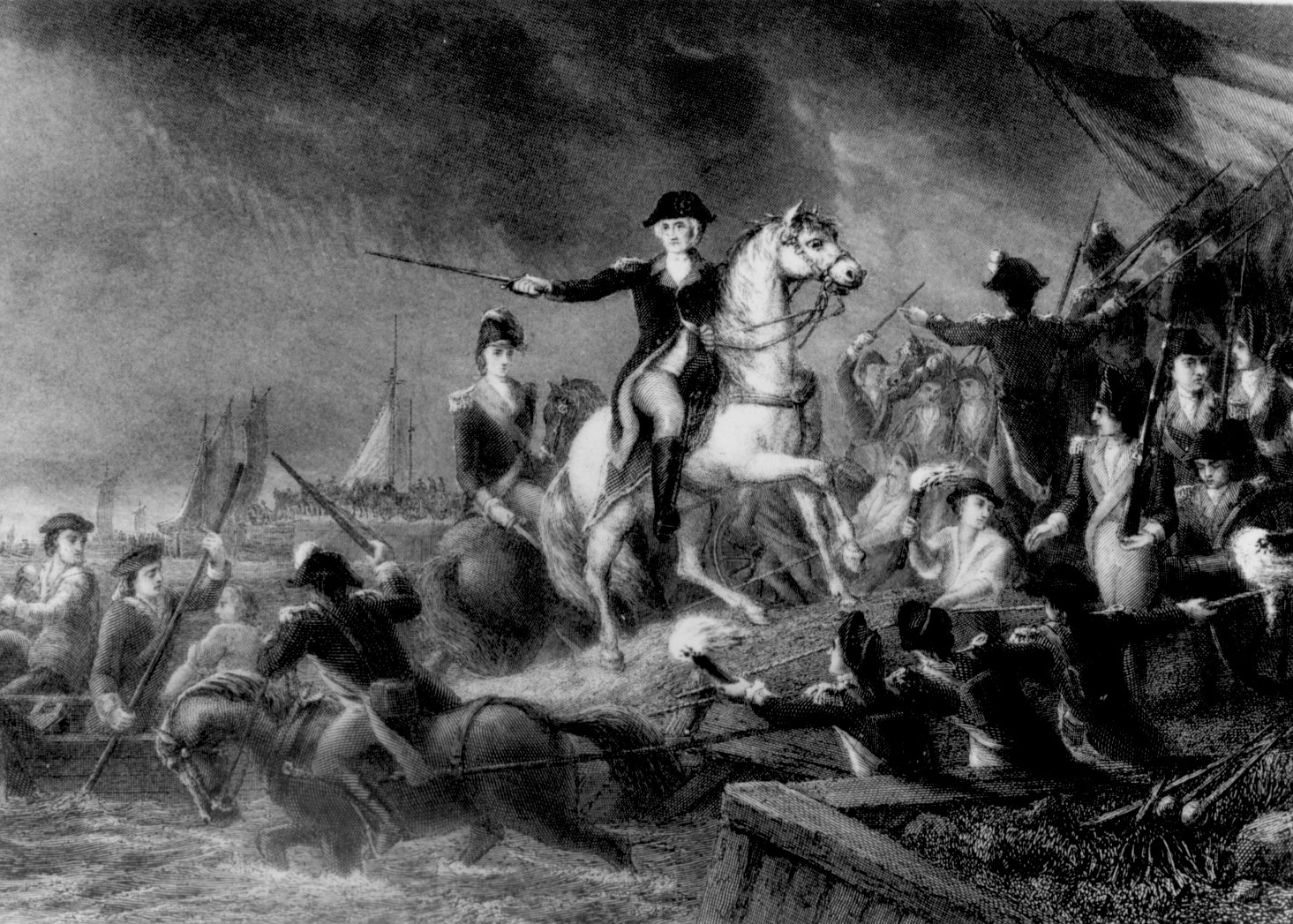
Washington leads the retreat from Long Island in August 1776

In August, the British finally launched their campaign to capture New York City. They first landed on Long Island in force, and flanked Washington's forward positions in the Battle of Long Island. Howe refused to act on a significant tactical advantage that could have resulted in the capture of the remaining Continental troops on Long Island, but he chose instead to besiege their positions. In the face of a siege he seemed certain to lose, Washington then decided to withdraw. In what some historians call one of his greatest military feats, executed a nighttime withdrawal from Long Island across the East River to Manhattan to save those troops.

The Howe brothers then paused to consolidate their position, and the admiral engaged in a fruitless peace conference with Congressional representatives on September 11. Four days later the British landed on Manhattan, scattering inexperienced militia into a panicked retreat, and forcing Washington to retreat further. After Washington stopped the British advance up Manhattan at Harlem Heights on September 16, Howe again made a flanking maneuver, landing troops at Pell's Point in a bid to cut off Washington's avenue of retreat. To defend against this move, Washington withdrew most of his army to White Plains, where after a short battle on October 28 he retreated further north. This isolated the remaining Continental Army troops in upper Manhattan, so Howe returned to Manhattan and captured Fort Washington in mid November, taking almost 3,000 prisoners. Four days later, Fort Lee, across the Hudson River from Fort Washington, was also taken. Washington brought much of his army across the Hudson into New Jersey, but was immediately forced to retreat by the aggressive British advance. During the campaign a general lack of organization, shortages of supplies, fatigue, sickness, and above all, lack of confidence in the American leadership resulted in a melting away of untrained regulars and frightened militia. Washington grumbled, "The honor of making a brave defense does not seem to be sufficient stimulus, when the success is very doubtful, and the falling into the Enemy's hands probable."

=== Counterattack in New Jersey ===
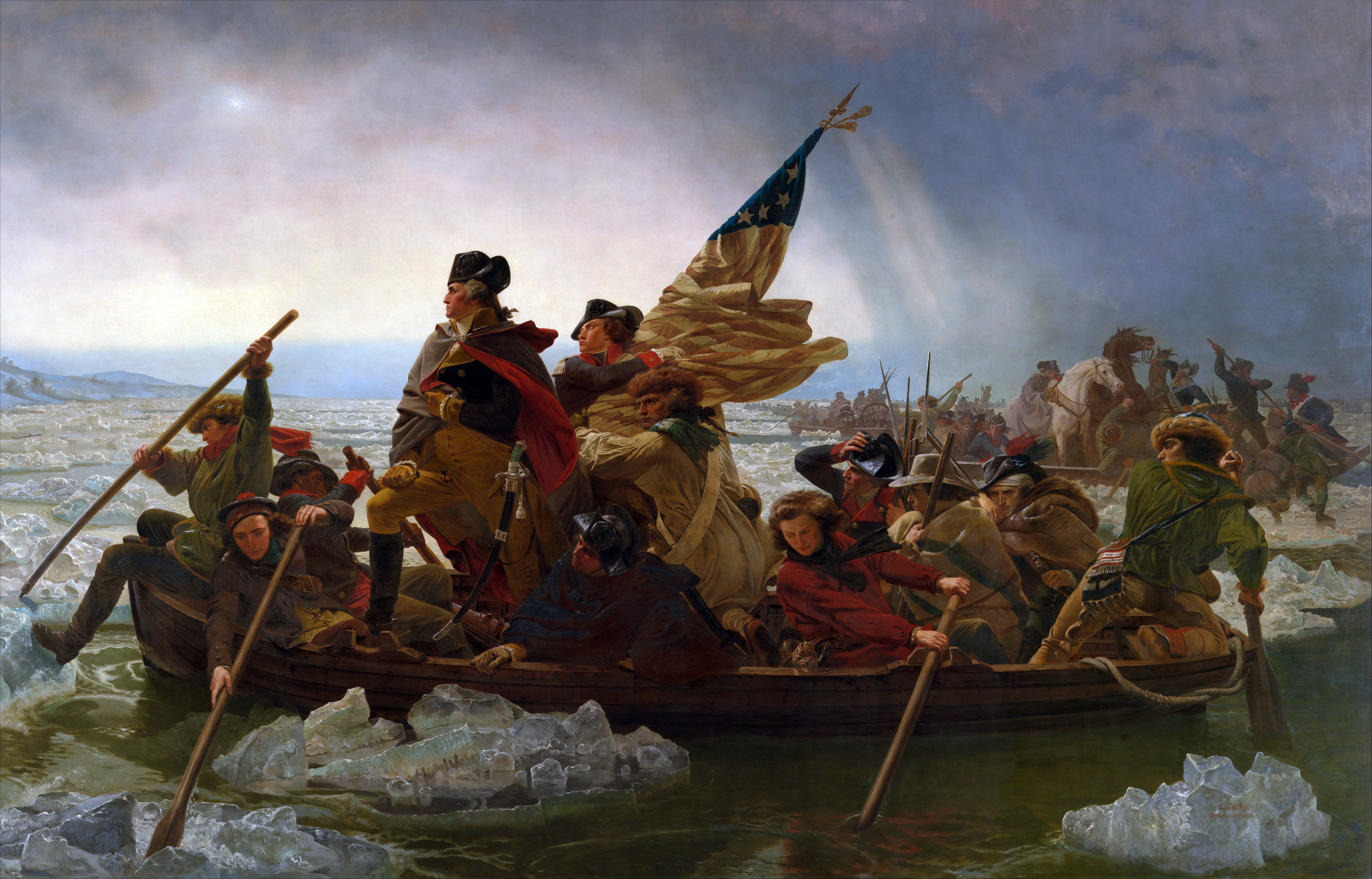
Washington Crossing the Delaware, by Emanuel Leutze, 1851

After the loss of New York, Washington's army was in two pieces. One detachment remained north of New York to protect the Hudson River corridor, while Washington retreated across New Jersey into Pennsylvania, chased by General Charles, Earl Cornwallis. Spirits were low, popular support was wavering, and Congress had abandoned Philadelphia, fearing a British attack. Washington ordered General Gates to bring troops from Fort Ticonderoga, and also ordered General Lee's troops, which he had left north of New York City, to join him.

Despite the loss of troops due to desertion and expiring enlistments, Washington was heartened by a rise in militia enlistments in New Jersey and Pennsylvania. These militia companies were active in circumscribing the furthest outposts of the British, limiting their ability to scout and forage. Although Washington did not coordinate this resistance, he took advantage of it to organize an attack on an outpost of Hessians in Trenton. On the night of December 25–26, 1776, Washington led his forces across the Delaware River and surprised the Hessian garrison the following morning, capturing 1,000 Hessians.

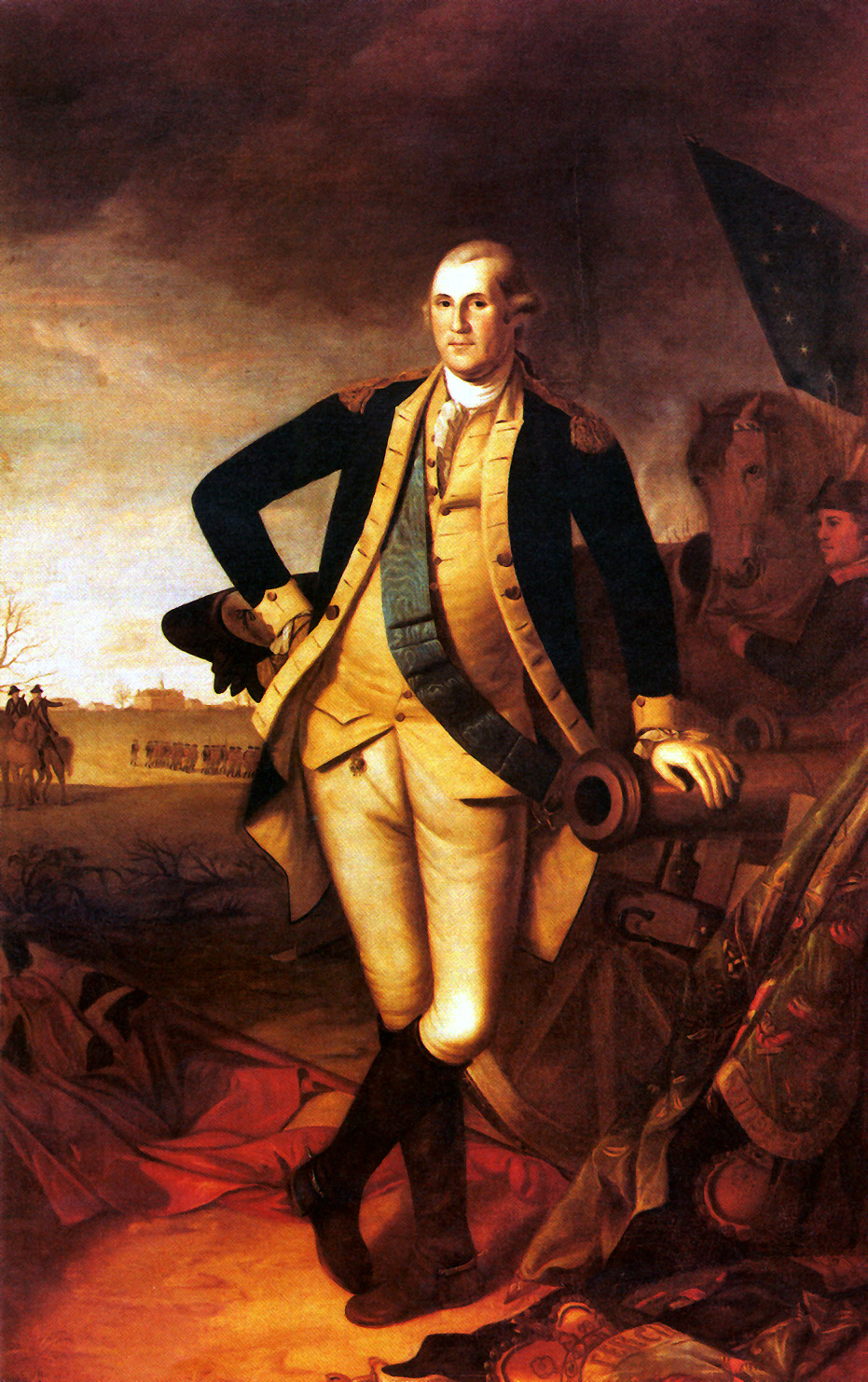
George Washington at Princeton a 1779 painting by Charles Willson Peale

This action significantly boosted the army's morale, but it also brought Cornwallis out of New York. He reassembled an army of more than 6,000 men, and marched most of them against a position Washington had taken south of Trenton. Leaving a garrison of 1,200 at Princeton, Cornwallis then attacked Washington's position on January 2, 1777, and was three times repulsed before darkness set in. Over the night, Washington evacuated the position, masking his army's movements by instructing the camp guards to maintain the appearance of a much larger force. Washington then circled around Cornwallis's position with the intention of attacking the Princeton garrison.

On January 3, Hugh Mercer, leading the American advance guard, encountered British soldiers from Princeton under the command of Charles Mawhood. The British troops engaged Mercer and in the ensuing battle, Mercer was mortally wounded. Washington sent reinforcements under General John Cadwalader, which were successful in driving Mawhood and the British from Princeton, with many of them fleeing to Cornwallis in Trenton. The British lost more than one quarter of their force in the battle, and American morale rose with the great victory.

These unexpected victories drove the British back to the New York City area, and gave a dramatic boost to Revolutionary morale. During the winter, Washington, based in winter quarters at Morristown, New Jersey, loosely coordinated a low-level militia war against British positions in New Jersey, combining the actions of New Jersey and Pennsylvania militia companies with careful use of Continental Army resources to harry and harass the British and German troops quartered in New Jersey.

Washington's mixed performance in the 1776 campaigns had not led to significant criticism in Congress. Before fleeing Philadelphia for Baltimore in December, Congress granted Washington powers that have ever since been described as "dictatorial". The successes in New Jersey nearly deified Washington in the eyes of some Congressmen, and the body became much more deferential to him as a result. Washington's performance also received international notice: Frederick the Great, one of the greatest military minds, wrote that "the achievements of Washington [at Trenton and Princeton] were the most brilliant of any recorded in the history of military achievements."

=== Loss of Philadelphia ===
In May 1777, the British resumed military operations, with General Howe attempting without success to draw Washington from his defensive position in Watchung Mountains in New Jersey, while General John Burgoyne led an army south from Quebec toward Albany, New York. Following Burgoyne's capture of Fort Ticonderoga without resistance in early July, General Howe boarded a large part of his army on transports and sailed off, leaving Washington mystified as to his destination. Washington dispatched some of his troops north to assist in Albany's defense, and moved most of the rest his forces south of Philadelphia when it became clear that was Howe's target.

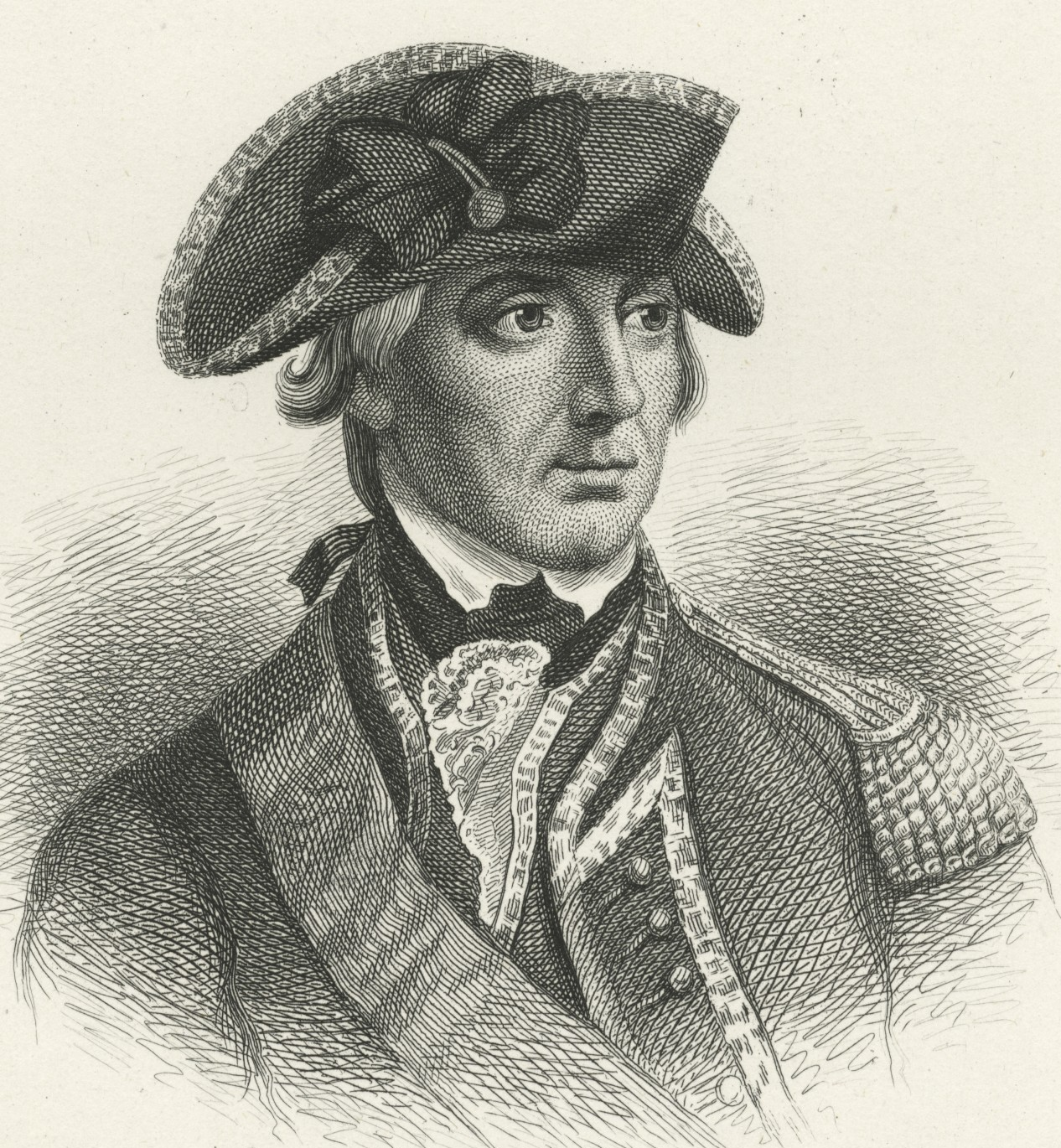
British General William Howe

Congress, at the urging of its diplomatic representatives in Europe, had also issued military commissions to a number of European soldiers of fortune in early 1777. Two of those recommended by Silas Deane, Marquis de Lafayette and Thomas Conway, proved to be important in Washington's activities. Lafayette, just twenty years old, was at first told that Deane had exceeded his authority in offering him a major general's commission, but offered to volunteer in the army at his own expense. Washington and Lafayette took an instant liking to one another when they met, and Lafayette became one of Washington's most trusted generals and confidants. Conway, on the other hand, did not think highly of Washington's leadership, and proved to be a source of trouble in the 1777 campaign season and its aftermath.

General Howe landed his troops south of Philadelphia at the northern end of Chesapeake Bay, and turned Washington's flank at the Battle of Brandywine near present-day Chadds Ford Township, Pennsylvania on September 11, 1777. After further maneuvers, Washington was forced to retreat away from the city, allowing British troops to march unopposed into Philadelphia on September 26. Washington's failure to defend the capital brought on a storm of criticism from Congress, which fled the city for York, and from other army officers. In part to silence his critics, Washington planned an elaborate assault on an exposed British base in Germantown. The October 4 Battle of Germantown failed in part due to the complexity of the assault, and the inexperience of the militia forces employed in it. Over 400 of Washington's troops were captured, including Colonel George Mathews and the entire 9th Virginia Regiment. It did not help that Adam Stephen, leading one of the branches of the attack, was drunk, and broke from the agreed-upon plan of attack. He was court martialed and cashiered from the army. Historian Robert Leckie observes that the battle was a near thing, and that a small number of changes might have resulted in a decisive victory for Washington.

=== Saratoga campaign ===
Washington's strategic decisions in the summer of 1777 greatly assisted Gates' army at Saratoga, New York, at the cost of his own campaign in the Philadelphia vicinity because he thought Howe would travel northward to Saratoga and not southward to Philadelphia. He took a major risk in July by detaching over a thousand soldiers from his own army to travel north to join the Saratoga campaign. He sent aid north in the form of Major General Benedict Arnold, his most aggressive field commander, and Major General Benjamin Lincoln, a Massachusetts man noted for his influence with the New England militia and also one of Washington's most favorite generals. He ordered 750 men from Israel Putnam's forces defending the New York highlands to join Gates' army. He also sent some of the best forces from his own army: Colonel Daniel Morgan and the newly formed Provisional Rifle Corps, which comprised about 500 specially selected riflemen from Pennsylvania, Maryland, and Virginia, chosen for their sharpshooting ability. This unit came to be known as Morgan's Riflemen.

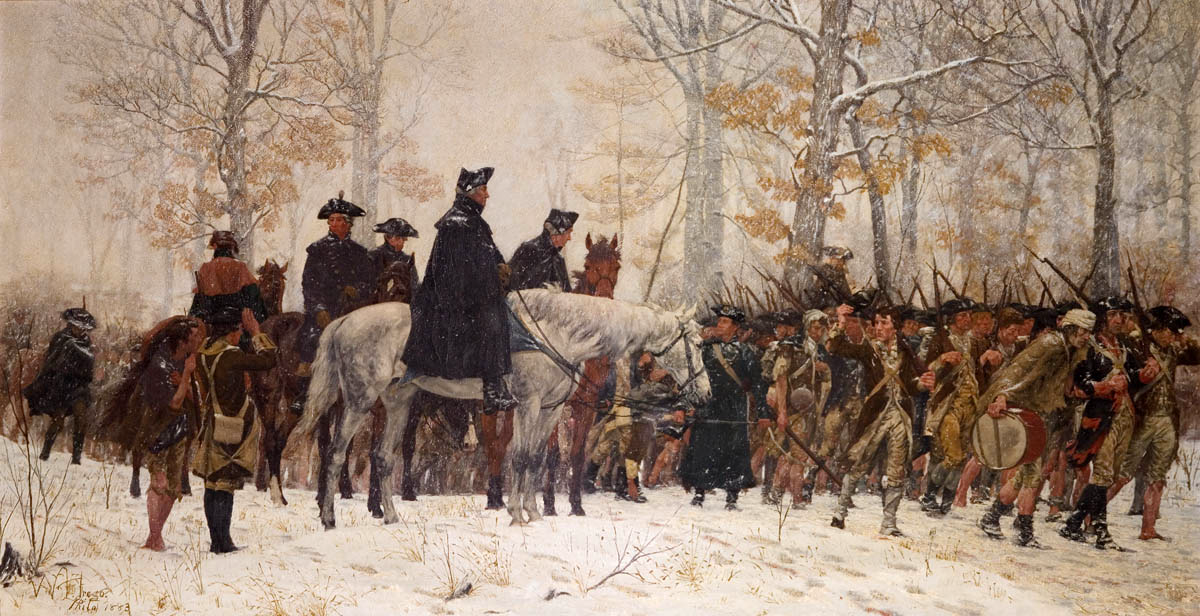
Washington's army as it marches toward Valley Forge

Unable to communicate with Howe, Burgoyne was left trapped, On October 17, ten days after the Battle of Bemis Heights, he was forced to surrender his entire army. The victory made a hero of General Gates, who received the adulation of Congress. While this was taking place Washington presided from a distance over the loss of control of the Delaware River to the British, and marched his army to its winter quarters at Valley Forge in December. Washington chose Valley Forge, over recommendations that he camp either closer or further from Philadelphia, because it was close enough to monitor British army movements, and protected rich farmlands to the west from the enemy's foraging expeditions.

=== Valley Forge ===
Washington's army stayed at Valley Forge for the next six months. Over the winter, approximately 2,500–3,000 out of 11,000 men died (although estimates vary) from disease and exposure. The army's difficulties were exacerbated by a number of factors, including a quartermaster's department that had been badly mismanaged by one of Washington's political opponents, Thomas Mifflin, and the preference of farmers and merchants to sell their goods to the British, who paid in sterling silver currency instead of the nearly worthless Continental paper currency. Profiteers also sought to benefit at the army's expense, charging it 1,000 times what they charged civilians for the same goods. Congress authorized Washington to seize supplies needed for the army, but he was reluctant to use such authority, since it smacked of the tyranny the war was supposedly being fought over.

During the winter he introduced a full-scale training program supervised by Baron von Steuben, a veteran of the Prussian general staff. Despite the hardships the army suffered, this program was a remarkable success, and Washington's army emerged in the spring of 1778 a much more disciplined force.

Washington himself had to face discontent at his leadership from a variety of sources. His loss of Philadelphia prompted some members of Congress to discuss removing him from command. They were prodded along by Washington's detractors in the military, who included Generals Gates, Mifflin, and Conway. Gates in particular was viewed by Conway and Congressmen Benjamin Rush and Richard Henry Lee as a desirable replacement for Washington. Although there is no evidence of a formal conspiracy, the episode is known as the Conway Cabal because the scale of the discontent within the army was exposed by a critical letter from Conway to Gates, some of whose contents were relayed to Washington. Washington exposed the criticisms to Congress, and his supporters, within Congress and the army, rallied to support him. Gates eventually apologized for his role in the affair, and Conway resigned. Washington's position and authority were not seriously challenged again. Biographer Ron Chernow points out that Washington's handling of the episode demonstrated that he was "a consummate political infighter" who maintained his temper and dignity while his opponents schemed.

=== French entry into the war ===
The victory at Saratoga and Germantown were influential in convincing France to enter the war openly as an American ally. French entry into the war changed its dynamics, for the British were no longer sure of command of the seas and had to worry about an invasion of their home islands and other colonial territories across the globe. The British, now under the command of General Sir Henry Clinton, evacuated Philadelphia in 1778 and returned to New York City, with Washington attacking them along the way at the Battle of Monmouth; this was the last major battle in the north. Prior to the battle Washington gave command of the advance forces to Charles Lee, who had been exchanged earlier in the year. Lee, despite firm instructions from Washington, refused Lafayette's suggestion to launch an organized attack on the British rear, and then retreated when the British turned to face him. When Washington arrived at the head of the main army, he and Lee had an angry exchange of words, and Washington ordered Lee off the command. Washington, with his army's tactics and ability to execute improved by the training programs of the previous winter, was able to recover, and fought the British to a draw. Lee was court martialed and eventually dismissed from the army.

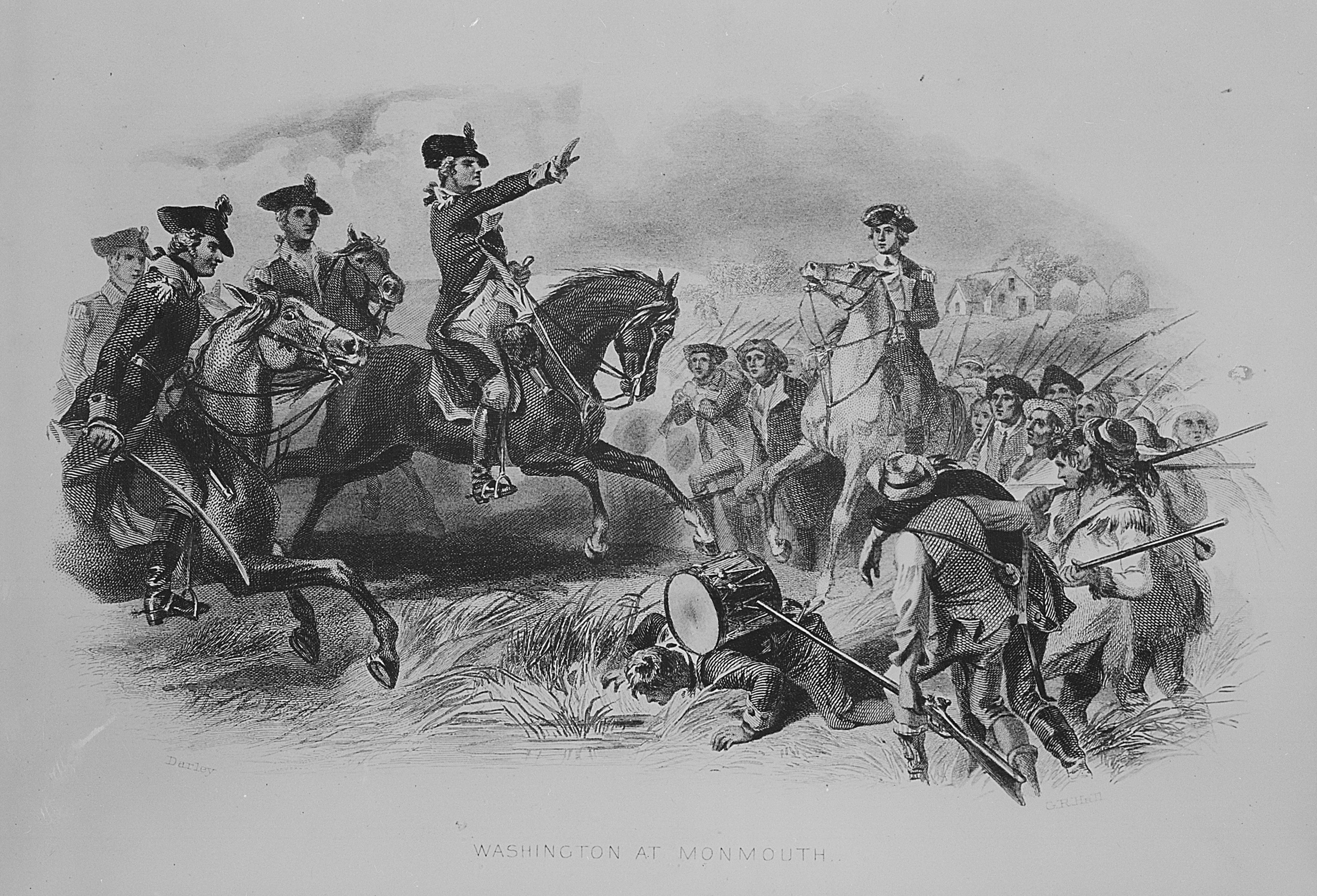
Washington at the Battle of Monmouth in New Jersey

The war in the north was effectively stalemated for the next few years. The British successfully defended Newport, Rhode Island against a Franco-American invasion attempt that was frustrated by bad weather and difficulties in cooperation between the allies. British and Indian forces organized and supported by Sir Frederick Haldimand in Quebec began to raid frontier settlements in 1778, and Savannah, Georgia, was captured late in the year. In response to the frontier activity Washington organised a major expedition against the Iroquois in the summer of 1779. In the Sullivan Expedition, a sizable force under Major General John Sullivan drove the Iroquois from their lands in northwestern New York in reprisal for the frontier raids.

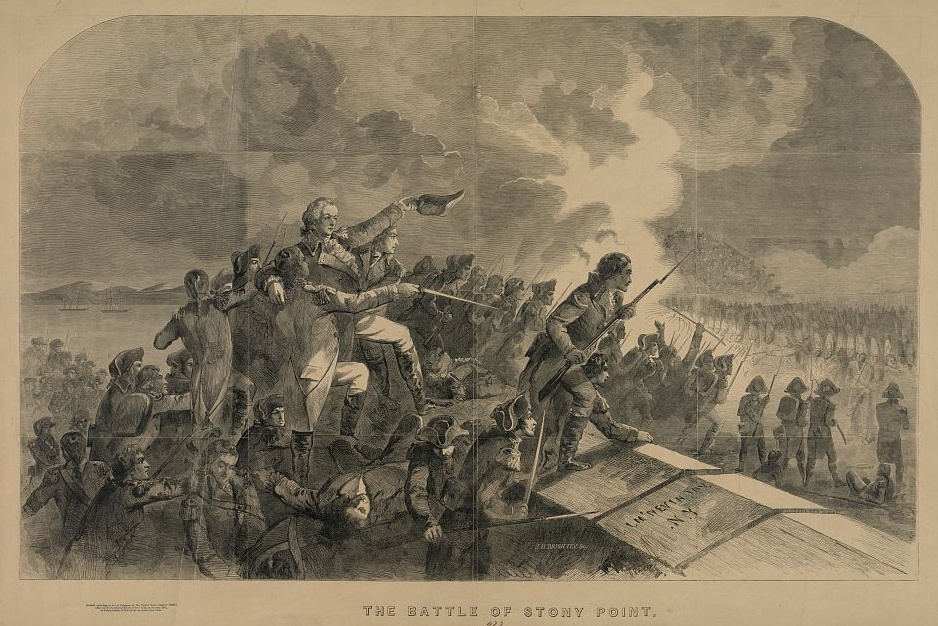
American General Anthony Wayne leading forces at the Battle of Stony Point in 1779

Washington's opponent in New York was also active. Clinton engaged in a number of amphibious raids against coastal communities from Connecticut to Chesapeake Bay, and probed at Washington's defenses in the Hudson River valley. Coming up the river in force, he captured the key outpost of Stony Point, but advanced no further. When Clinton weakened the garrison there to provide men for raiding expeditions, Washington organized a counterstrike. General Anthony Wayne led a force that, solely using the bayonet, recaptured Stony Point. The Americans chose not to hold the post, but the operation was a boost to American morale and a blow to British morale. American morale was dealt a blow later in the year, when the second major attempt at Franco-American cooperation, an attempt to retake Savannah, failed with heavy casualties.

=== Difficult times ===
The winter of 1779–80 was one of the coldest in recorded colonial history. New York Harbor froze over, and the winter camps of the Continental Army were deluged with snow, resulting in hardships exceeding those experienced at Valley Forge. The war was declining in popularity, and the inflationary issuance of paper currency by Congress and the states alike harmed the economy, and the ability to provision the army. The paper currency also hit the army's morale, since it was how the troops were paid.

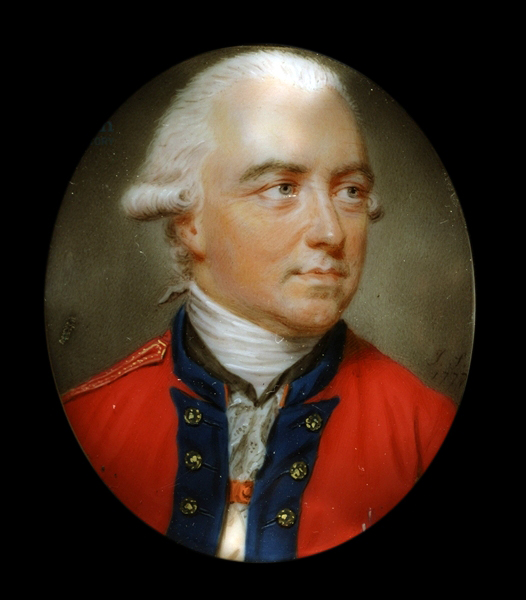
British General Sir Henry Clinton

The British in late 1779 embarked on a new strategy based on the assumption that most Southerners were Loyalists at heart. General Clinton withdrew the British garrison from Newport, and marshalled a force of more than 10,000 men that in the first half of 1780 successfully besieged Charleston, South Carolina. In June 1780, he captured over 5,000 Continental Army soldiers and militia in the single worst defeat of the war for the Americans. Washington had at the end of March pessimistically dispatched several regiments troops southward from his army, hoping they might have some effect in what he saw as a looming disaster.

Washington's army suffered from numerous problems in 1780: it was undermanned, underfunded, and underequipped. Because of these shortcomings Washington resisted calls for major expeditions, preferring to remain focused on the principal British presence in New York. Knowledge of discontent within the ranks in New Jersey prompted the British in New York to make two attempts to reach the principal army base at Morristown. These attempts were defeated, with significant militia support, in battles at Connecticut Farms and Springfield.

In September 1780, British Major John André was arrested outside New York, and papers he carried exposed a conspiracy between the British and General Benedict Arnold. Washington respected Arnold for his military skills. After Arnold's severe injuries in the Battles of Saratoga in October 1777, Washington gave him the military command of Philadelphia. During his administration there, Arnold had made many political enemies, and in 1779 he began secret negotiations with General Clinton, which were mediated in part by André and culminated in a plot to surrender West Point, a command Arnold requested and Washington gave him in July 1780. Arnold was alerted to André's arrest and fled to the British lines shortly before Washington's arrival at West Point for a meeting. In negotiations with Clinton, Washington offered to exchange André for Arnold, but Clinton refused. André was hanged as a spy, and Arnold became a brigadier general in the British Army. Washington organized an attempt to kidnap Arnold from New York City; it was frustrated when Arnold was sent on a raiding expedition to Virginia.

=== Espionage ===
Washington was successful in developing an espionage network, which kept track of the British and loyalist forces while misleading the enemy as to the strength of the American and French positions, and their intentions. British intelligence, by contrast, was poorly done. Many prominent loyalists had fled to London, where they convinced Lord Jermaine and other top officials that there was a large potential loyalist fighting force that would rise up and join the British as soon as they were in the vicinity. This was entirely false, but the British relied upon it heavily, especially in the southern campaigns of 1780–81, leading to their disasters. Washington deceived the British in New York City marching his entire army, the entire French Army, around the city all the way to Virginia, where they surprised Cornwallis and his army. The greatest failure of British intelligence was the misunderstanding between the senior command in London, and New York regarding the need to support Burgoyne's invasion of New York. British communication failures and lack of intelligence on what was happening led to the surrender of Burgoyne's entire army.

Washington used systematic reconnaissance on enemy positions by scouts and sponsored Major Benjamin Tallmadge who set up the Culper spy ring. Washington distrusted double agents, and was fooled by Benedict Arnold's treachery. Washington paid close attention to espionage reports, and acted on them. He made sure his intelligence officers briefed one another; he did not insist on prior approval of their plans. His intelligence system became an essential arm in molding the Americans partisan style asymmetrical strategy. This laid the groundwork in the 1790s for Washington to formulate intelligence gathering as an important tool in presidential power.

=== Victory ===
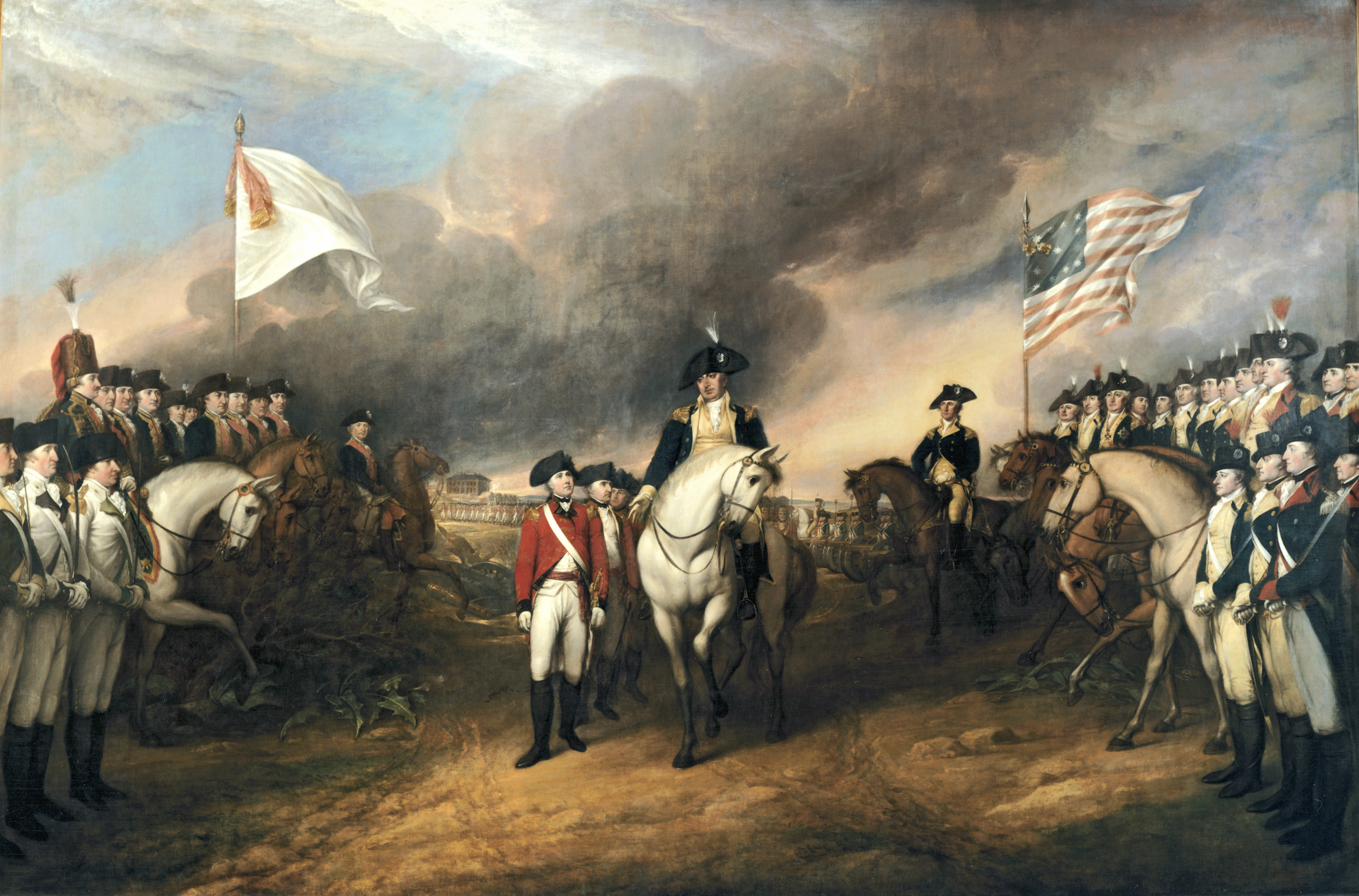
Surrender of Lord Cornwallis, a painting John Trumbull depicting the surrender of Cornwallis' army following the Siege of Yorktown

A British army under General Cornwallis, fighting its way through the Carolinas and Virginia, made its way to Yorktown, Virginia to be evacuated by the British Navy. Washington coordinated an elaborate operation whereby both the French army in New England and the American Army in New York slipped off to Virginia without the British noticing. Cornwallis found himself surrounded, and a French naval victory against the British rescue fleet dashed his hopes. The surrender of Cornwallis to Washington on October 17, 1781, marked the end of serious fighting. In London, the war party lost control of parliament, and the British negotiated the Treaty of Paris in 1783, which ended the war and established American independence. Hoping to gain the United States as a major trading partner, the British offered surprisingly generous terms.

Washington designed the Continental Army's strategy for victory, which enabled his forces to maintain their strength for six years and to capture two major British armies at Saratoga in 1777 and Yorktown in 1781. Some historians have lauded Washington for the selection and supervision of his generals, preservation and command of the army, coordination with the Congress, with state governors and their militia, and attention to supplies, logistics, and training, and although Washington was repeatedly outmaneuvered by British generals, his overall strategy proved to be successful: keep control of 90% of the population at all times, including suppression of the Loyalist civilian population; keep the army intact; avoid decisive battles; and look for an opportunity to capture an outnumbered enemy army. Washington was a military conservative: he preferred building a regular army on the European model and fighting a conventional war, and often complained about the undisciplined American militia.

=== Resignation ===
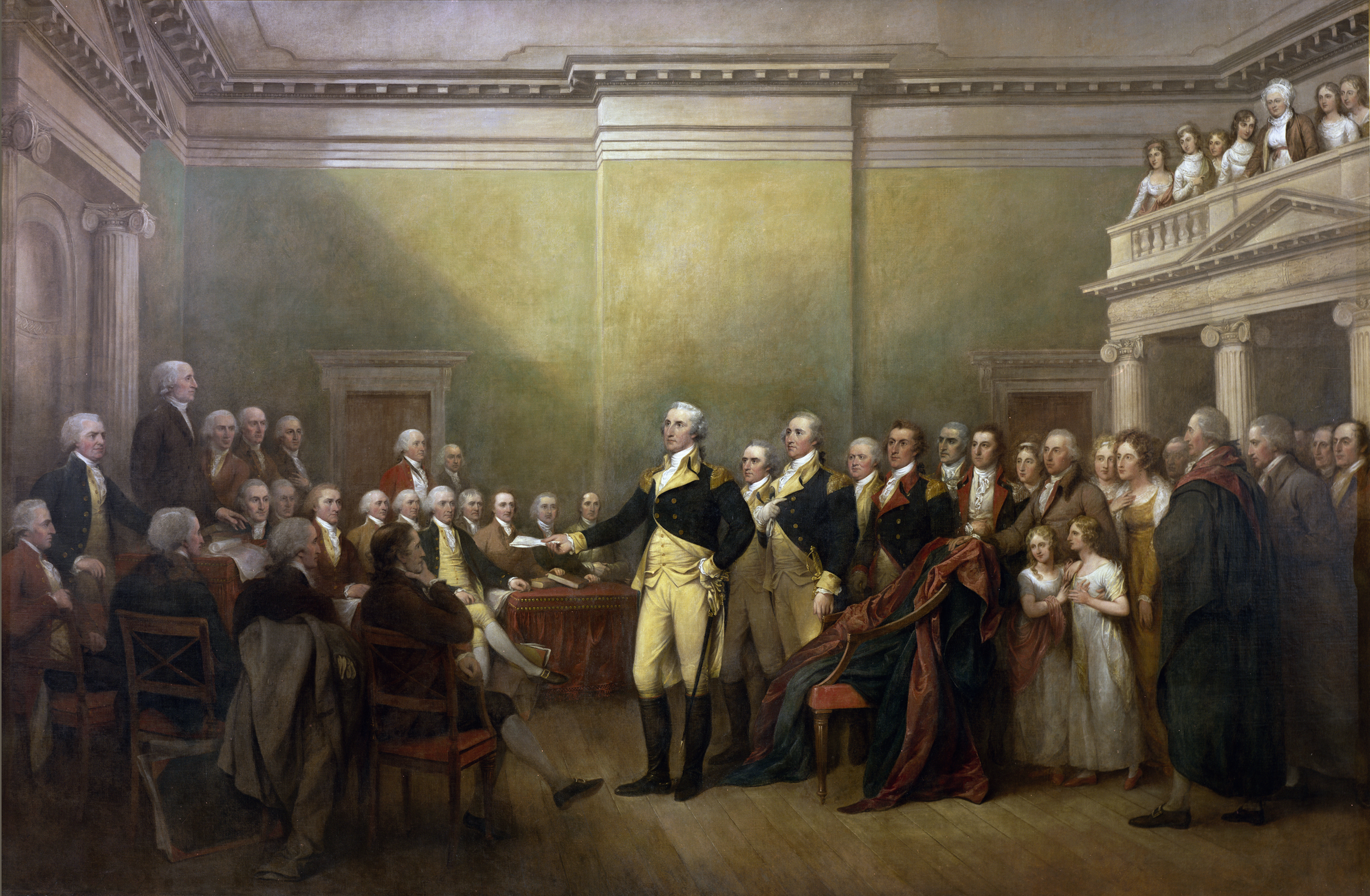
General George Washington Resigning His Commission, an 1824 painting by John Trumbull

One of Washington's most important contributions as commander-in-chief was to establish the precedent that civilian-elected officials, rather than military officers, possessed ultimate authority over the military. This was a key principle of Republicanism, but could easily have been violated by Washington. Throughout the war, he deferred to the authority of Congress and state officials, and he relinquished his considerable military power once the fighting was over. In March 1783, Washington used his influence to disperse a group of Army officers who had threatened to confront Congress regarding their back pay. Washington disbanded his army and announced his intent to resign from public life in his "Farewell Orders to the Armies of the United States." A few days later, on November 25, 1783, the British evacuated New York City, and Washington and the governor took possession of the city; at Fraunces Tavern in the city on December 4, he formally bade his officers farewell. On December 23, 1783, Washington resigned his commission as commander-in-chief to the Congress of the Confederation at Annapolis, Maryland.

== Quasi-War service ==
In the fall of 1798, Washington became immersed in the business of creating a military force to deal with the threat of an all-out war with France. President John Adams asked him to resume the post of commander-in-chief and to raise an army in the event war broke out. Washington agreed, stipulating that he would only serve in the field if it became absolutely necessary, and if he could choose his subordinates. Disputes arose over the relative rankings of his chosen command. Washington selected Alexander Hamilton as his inspector general and second in command, followed by Charles Cotesworth Pinckney and Henry Knox. This hierarchy was an inversion of the ranks these men had held during the revolution. Adams wanted to reverse the order, giving Knox the most important role, but Washington was insistent, threatening to resign if his choices were not approved. He prevailed, but the episode noticeably cooled his relationship with Henry Knox, and impaired Adams' relations with his cabinet. The resolution of this affair brought no opportunity for rest: Washington engaged in the tedious task of finding officers for the new military formations. In spring 1799, the relaxation of tensions between France and the United States allowed Washington to redirect his attention to his personal affairs.

== Posthumous promotion ==
George Washington died on December 14, 1799, at the age of 67. Upon his passing he was listed as a retired lieutenant general on the rolls of the US Army. Over the next 177 years, various officers surpassed Washington in rank, the first of whom was Ulysses S. Grant, who was promoted to General of the Army in 1866 for his role in the American Civil War. With effect from 4 July 1976, Washington was posthumously promoted to General of the Armies by authority of a congressional joint resolution. The resolution stated that Washington's seniority had rank and precedence over all other grades of the Armed Forces, past or present, effectively making Washington the highest ranked U.S. officer of all time.

== Historical evaluations ==
Historians debate whether Washington preferred to fight major battles or to utilize a Fabian strategy (Note: The term comes from the Roman strategy used by General Fabius against Hannibal's invasion in the Second Punic War.) to harass the British with quick, sharp attacks followed by a retreat so that the larger British army could not catch him. (Note: Ferling, and Ellis argue that Washington favored Fabian tactics, and Higginbotham denies it.) His southern commander Nathanael Greene did use Fabian tactics in 1780–81; Washington did so only in fall 1776 to spring 1777, after losing New York City and seeing much of his army melt away. Trenton and Princeton were Fabian's examples. By summer 1777 Washington had rebuilt his strength and his confidence; he stopped using raids and went for large-scale confrontations, as at Brandywine, Germantown, Monmouth, and Yorktown.

== Rank history ==
Rank	Organization	Date
Major and Adjutant	Province of Virginia militia	December 13, 1752
Lieutenant Colonel	Virginia Regiment	March 15, 1754
Colonel (and Commander-in-Chief)	Virginia Regiment	August 14, 1755
General (General and Commander-in-Chief)	Continental Army	June 15, 1775
Lieutenant General	United States Army	July 3, 1798
General of the Armies of the United States (posthumous)	United States Army	13 March 1978, retroactive to July 4, 1976

- While serving as a General, Washington wore three six-pointed stars (three five-pointed stars are now used as the insignia of a lieutenant general).

== Summaries of Washington's Revolutionary War battles ==
The following are summaries of battles where George Washington was the commanding officer.

Battle	Date	Result	Opponent	American troop strength	Enemy troop strength	American casualties	Enemy casualties	Notes
Boston	July 2, 1775 – March 17, 1776	Victory	Gage and Howe	6,000–16,000	4,000–11,000	19	95	
Long Island	August 27, 1776	Defeat	Howe	10,000	20,000	2,000	388	
Kip's Bay	September 15, 1776	Defeat	Clinton	500	4,000	370	12	
Harlem Heights	September 16, 1776	Victory	Leslie	1,800	5,000	130	92–390	Washington's first battlefield victory of the war.
White Plains	October 28, 1776	Defeat	Howe	3,100	4,000–7,500	217	233	
Fort Washington	November 16, 1776	Defeat	Howe	3,000	8,000	2,992	458	
Trenton	December 26, 1776	Victory	Rall	2,400	1,500	5	905–1,005	
Second Trenton	January 2, 1777	Victory	Cornwallis	6,000	5,000	7–100	55–365	
Princeton	January 3, 1777	Victory	Mawhood	4,500	1,200	65–89	270–450	
Brandywine	September 11, 1777	Defeat	Howe	14,600	15,500	1,300	587	
The Clouds	September 16, 1777	Defeat	Howe	10,000	18,000	100	100	
Germantown	October 4, 1777	Defeat	Howe	11,000	9,000	1,111	533	
White Marsh	December 5–8, 1777	Inconclusive	Howe	9,500	10,000	204	112	
Monmouth	June 28, 1778	Inconclusive	Clinton	11,000	14,000–15,000	362–500	295–1,136	
Yorktown	September 28 – October 19, 1781	Victory	Cornwallis	18,900	9,000	389	7,884–8,589	

== See also ==
- List of United States militia units in the American Revolutionary War
- Bibliography of George Washington
- List of George Washington articles
- George Washington's relations with the Iroquois Confederacy

== Sources ==
- Alden, John R. (1993). George Washington, a Biography. Norwalk: Easton Press. ISBN 9780807141083.
- Anderson, Fred (2000). Crucible of War: The Seven Years' War and the Fate of Empire in British North America, 1754–1766. New York: Alfred A. Knopf. ISBN 978-0-375-40642-3.
- Anderson, Fred (2005). The War That Made America. New York: Viking. ISBN 0-670-03454-1.
- Bell, William Gardner. Commanding Generals and Chiefs of Staff (Center of Military History)
- Buchanan, John (2004). The Road to Valley Forge: How Washington Built the Army that Won the Revolution. Hoboken, NJ: John Wiley & Sons. ISBN 978-0471-44156-4.
- Chernow, Ron (2010). Washington: A Life. New York: Penguin. ISBN 978-1-59420-266-7. OCLC 535490473.
- Ellis, Joseph J. (2004). His Excellency: George Washington. New York: Alfred A. Knopf. ISBN 1-4000-4031-0.
- Ferling, John E. (2010) [1988]. First of Men: A Life of George Washington. New York: Oxford University Press. ISBN 978-0-19-539867-0.
- Fischer, David Hackett (2004). Washington's Crossing. Oxford, England; New York: Oxford University Press. ISBN 0-19-517034-2.
- Fleming, Thomas (2005). Washington's Secret War. New York: Smithsonian Books. ISBN 978-0-06-082962-9. OCLC 237047336.
- Flexner, James Thomas (1968). George Washington in the American Revolution (1775–1783). Boston: Little, Brown. OCLC 166632872. Second volume of Flexner's four-volume biography.
- Flexner, James Thomas (1974). Washington: The Indispensable Man. Boston, MA: Little, Brown. OCLC 450725539. Single-volume condensation of Flexner's four-volume biography.
- Freeman, Douglas S (1948–1957). George Washington: A Biography. New York: Scribner. OCLC 425613. Seven volumes scholarly biography, winner of the Pulitzer Prize.
- Freeman, Douglas S; Harwell, Richard (1968). Washington. New York: Scribner. OCLC 426557. Abridgement of Freeman's multivolume biography.
- —— (1968). Harwell, Richard Barksdale (ed.). Washington. New York: Scribner. OCLC 426557.
- Grizzard, Frank E. Jr. (2002) George Washington: A Biographical Companion. ABC-CLIO, 2002. 436 pp. Comprehensive encyclopedia
- Higginbotham, Don (1985). George Washington and the American Military Tradition. Athens, GA: University of Georgia Press. ISBN 978-0-8203-0786-2. OCLC 489783125.
- Higginbotham, Don (1971). The War of American Independence: Military Attitudes, Policies, and Practice, 1763–1789.
- Ketchum, Richard M (1973). The Winter Soldiers. Garden City, NY: Doubleday. ISBN 0-385-05490-4. OCLC 640266.
- Leckie, Robert (1993). George Washington's War: The Saga of the American Revolution. New York: HarperCollins. ISBN 978-0-06-092215-3. OCLC 29748139.
- Lengel, Edward G. (2005). General George Washington: A Military Life. New York: Random House. ISBN 1-4000-6081-8.
- Lengel, Edward G. ed. (2012) A Companion to George Washington, (2012), essays by scholars that emphasize the historiography
- Lengel, Edward G. ed. (2007) The Glorious Struggle: George Washington's Revolutionary War Letters (Smithsonian Books, 2007), Primary sources
- Jerry D. Morelock (2002). "Washington as Strategist". Compound Warfare. DIANE Publishing. pp. 53–89. ISBN 978-1-4289-1090-4.
- Overhoff, Jürgen (2026). George Washington and Frederick the Great: Parallel Lives. Translated by Baker, Patrick. Princeton University Press. ISBN 978-0691226712.
- Randall, Willard Sterne (1997). George Washington: A Life. Henry Holt. ISBN 9780805027792.
- Royster, Charles. (1979) A Revolutionary People at War: The Continental Army and the American Character, 1775–1783 (University of North Carolina Press, 1979)

=== Espionage ===
- Crary, Catherine Snell. "The Tory and the Spy: The Double Life of James Rivington." William and Mary Quarterly (1959): 16#1 pp 61–72. online
- Harty, Jared B. "George Washington: Spymaster and General Who Saved the American Revolution" (Staff paper, No. ATZL-SWV. Army Command And General Staff College Fort Leavenworth, School Of Advanced Military Studies, 2012) online.
- Kaplan, Roger. "The Hidden War: British Intelligence Operations during the American Revolution." William and Mary Quarterly (1990) 47#1: 115–138. online
- Kilmeade, Brian, and Don Yaeger. George Washington's Secret Six: The Spy Ring that Saved the American Revolution (Penguin, 2016).
- Mahoney, Harry Thayer, and Marjorie Locke Mahoney. Gallantry in action: A biographic dictionary of espionage in the American revolutionary war (University Press of America, 1999).
- Misencik, Paul R. Sally Townsend, George Washington's Teenage Spy (McFarland, 2015).
- O'Toole, George J.A. Honorable Treachery: A History of US Intelligence, Espionage, and Covert Action from the American Revolution to the CIA (2nd ed. 2014).
- Rose, Alexander. Washington's Spies: The Story of America's First Spy Ring (2006)
