= La Grange (La Plata, Maryland) =

Historic house in Maryland, United States

- U.S. National Register of Historic Places
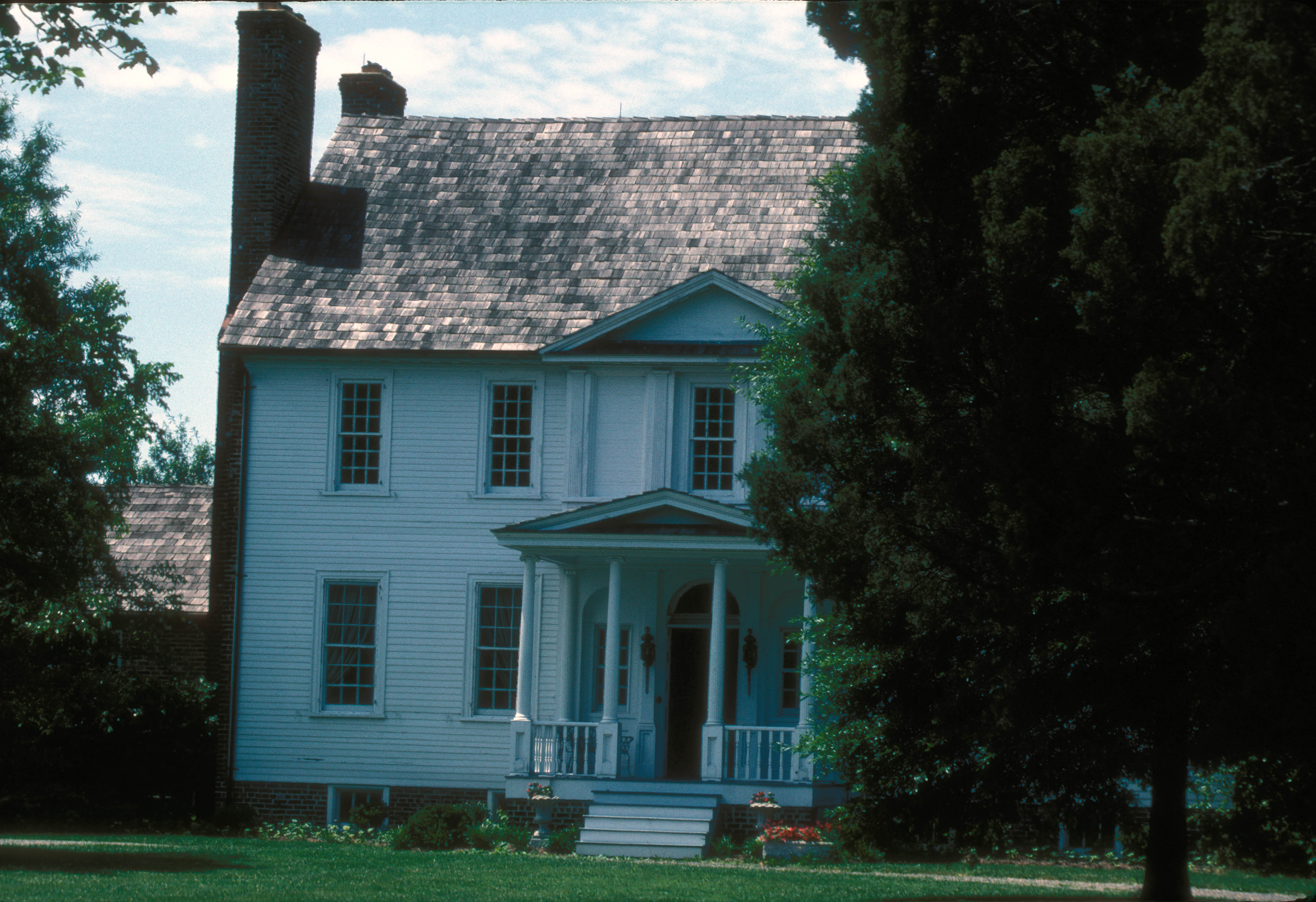

- Location within Maryland Location within the United States
- Location: MD 6, W of U.S. 301, La Plata, Maryland
- Coordinates: 38°31′27″N 76°59′28″W
- Architect: Craik, Dr. James
- NRHP reference No.: 76000990
- Added to NRHP: October 22, 1976

La Grange is a historic home located at La Plata, Charles County, Maryland, United States. It is a house built in the Georgian neoclassic style, and was the home of Dr. James Craik from 1765 to 1783.

La Grange was listed on the National Register of Historic Places in 1976.
