= Town Destroyer =

Haudenosaunee nickname for George Washington

Conotocaurius (Note: Oneida: lanatakályas; Onondaga: Hanadagá·yas; Cayuga: Hanadagá:nyahs; Seneca: Hanödaga꞉nyas; Tuscarora: Kanętaká·ryahs) (Town Destroyer, Seneca: Hanödaga:nyas) was a nickname given to George Washington by Haudenosaunee peoples in 1753. The name in its original language(s) has been given variously as Conotocarius, Conotocaurious, Caunotaucarius, Conotocarious, Hanodaganears, and Hanadahguyus. It has also been translated as "Town Taker", "Burner of Towns", "Devourer of Villages", or "he destroys the town".

== History ==
George Washington was given the name in 1753 by the Seneca leader Tanacharison. The nickname had previously been given to his great-grandfather John Washington in the late 17th century. John Washington was a colonel in the Virginian colonial militia during the events leading up to Bacon's Rebellion, involving conflicts with the Susquehannock, the Doeg and the Piscataway. Following raids by the Doegs on Virginian settlers, the colonial militia responded by tracking down and killing both Doegs and Susquehannocks. Colonial officers invited five Susquehannock chiefs to parley under a flag of truce, but when they denied their responsibility for the earlier Doeg raids, the colonial militia murdered them. Following this incident, the Susquehannock gave Col. John Washington an Algonquian name that translated to "town taker" or "devourer of villages." The elder Washington's reputation was remembered and when they met his great-grandson in 1753 they called George Washington by the same name, Conotocarious.

Washington referred to himself as "Conotocaurious" in a letter he wrote to Andrew Montour dated October 10, 1755, in which he tried to manipulate the Oneida to resettle on the Potomac:

Recommend me kindly to our good friend Monacatootha, and others; tell them how happy it would make Conotocaurious to have an opportunity of taking them by the hand at Fort Cumberland, and how glad he would be to treat them as brothers of our Great King beyond the waters. "

In 1779 during the American Revolutionary War, the Sullivan Expedition, under Washington's orders, destroyed over 40 Haudenosaunee villages in New York, partially in response to Haudenosaunee participation in attacks on the Wyoming Valley in July 1778 and Cherry Valley in November 1778. In 1790, the Seneca chief Cornplanter told President Washington: "When your army entered the country of the Six Nations, we called you Town Destroyer and to this day when your name is heard our women look behind them and turn pale, and our children cling close to the necks of their mothers."
