= Craik-Patton House =

Historic house in West Virginia, United States

- U.S. National Register of Historic Places
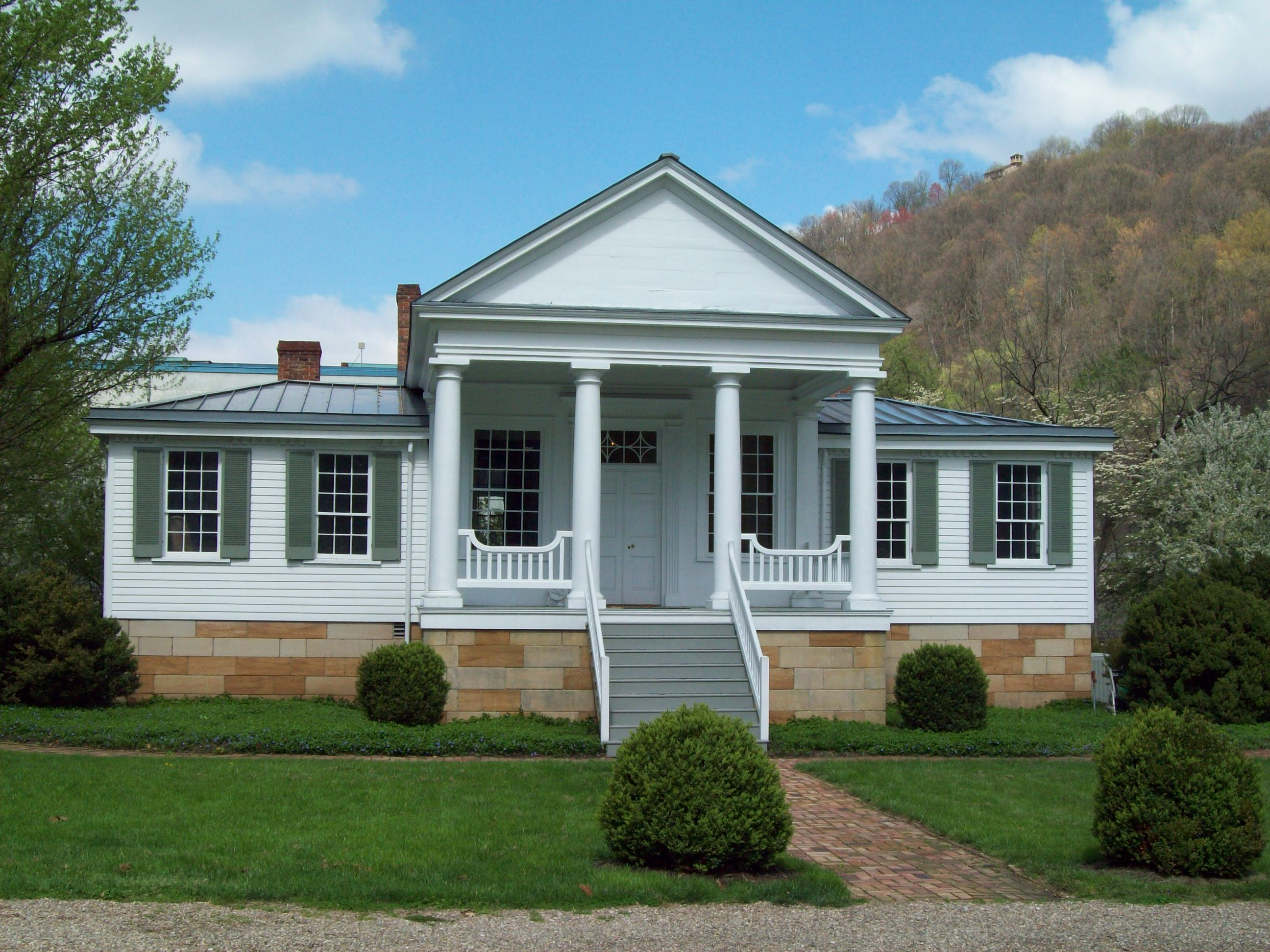
- Craik-Patton House, April 2009

- Location within West Virginia Location within the United States
- Location: U.S. 60 in Daniel Boone Roadside Park, Charleston, West Virginia
- Coordinates: 38°19′54″N 81°35′10″W
- Built: 1834
- Architectural style: Greek Revival
- NRHP reference No.: 75001894
- Added to NRHP: August 12, 1970

Craik-Patton House is a historic home and public museum located at Charleston, West Virginia. It was built by James Craik and his wife, Juliet Shrewsbury, in 1834 in the Greek Revival style. It was originally located on Virginia Street in Charleston, but moved to its present site in 1973 to save it from the threat of demolition. It features four massive columns that support the extended center roof with pilasters placed above the front facade. It was faithfully restored and preserved for the public by the National Society of the Colonial Dames of America in the state of West Virginia and open for tours year round.

Though originally named "Elm Grove" the house is now called the Craik-Patton House in honor of Rev. James Craik who built the house, who was the grandson and namesake of George Washington's physician, Dr. James Craik. The Patton aspect of the name comes from Col. George S. Patton, grandfather of WWII hero George Patton, who lived in the house with his family from 1858 until his passing.

The Craik Patton House also features attractions of interest relating to several other prominent families of the Kanawha River Valley region. Within the house itself can be found artifacts from the two families it takes its name from, and other important furnishings and objects relating to the Kanawha Valley's role in local history.

It was listed on the National Register of Historic Places in 1970.

== Gallery ==
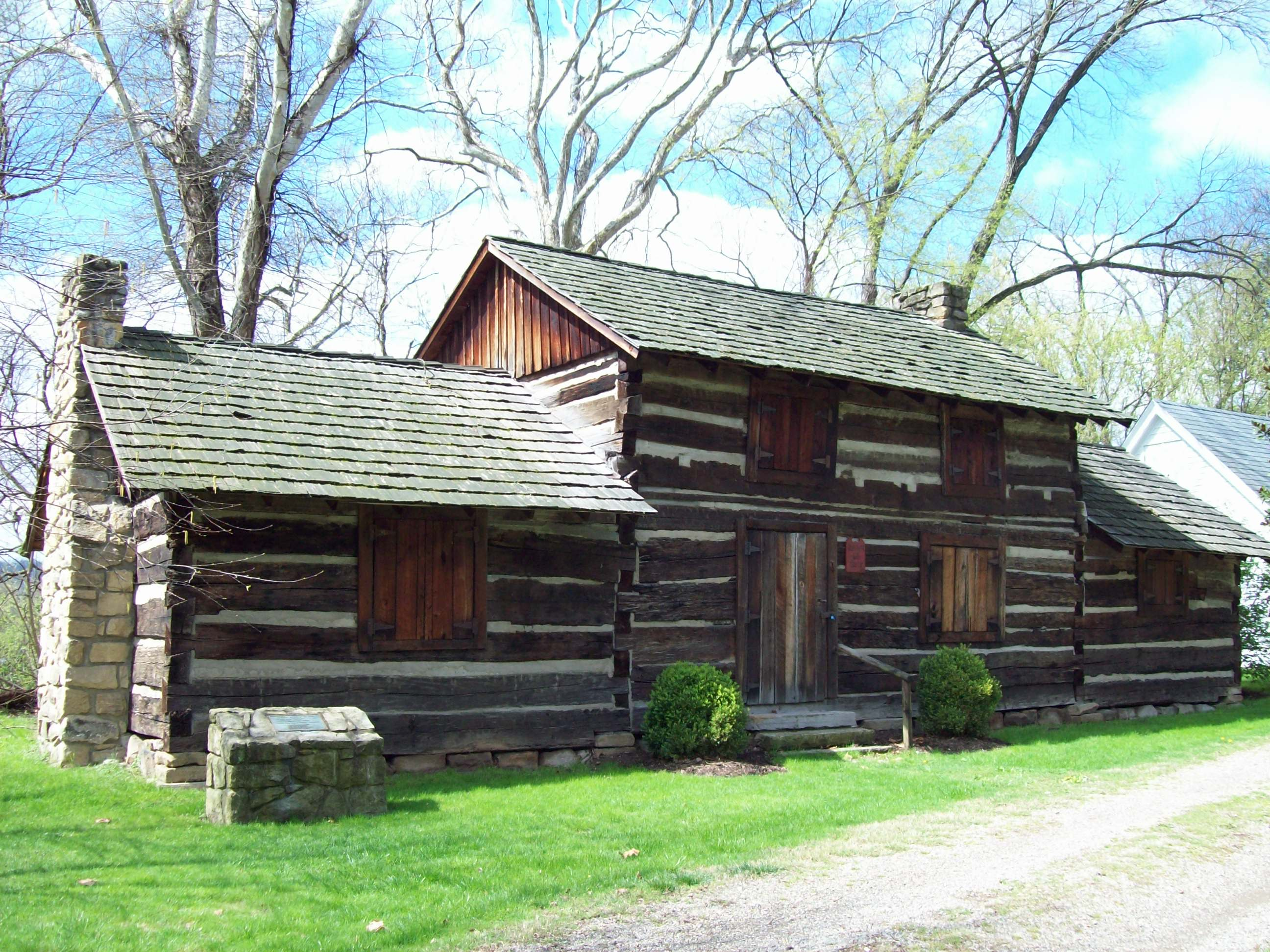
Ruffner Log House, April 2009

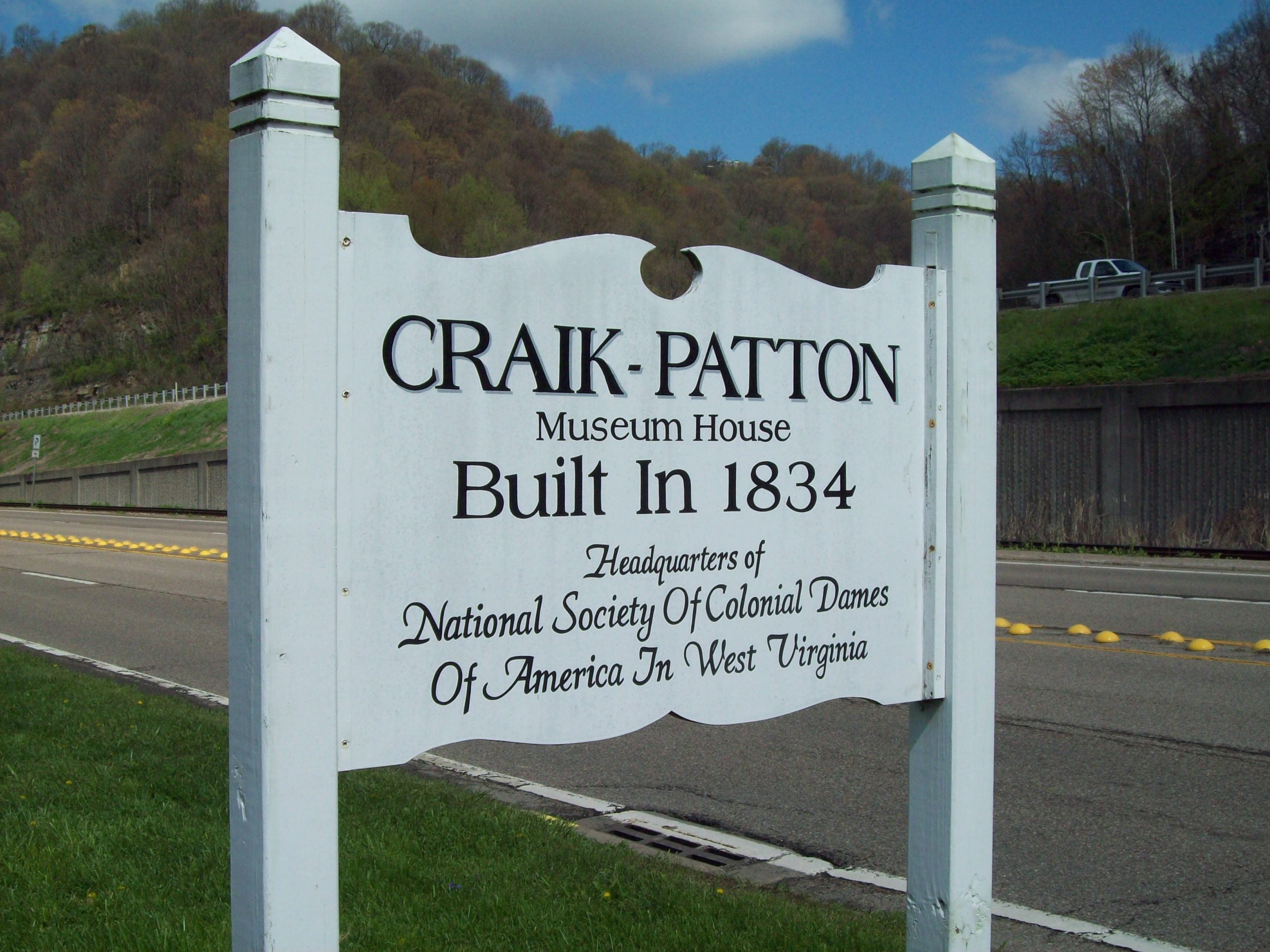
Craik-Patton Sign, April 2009

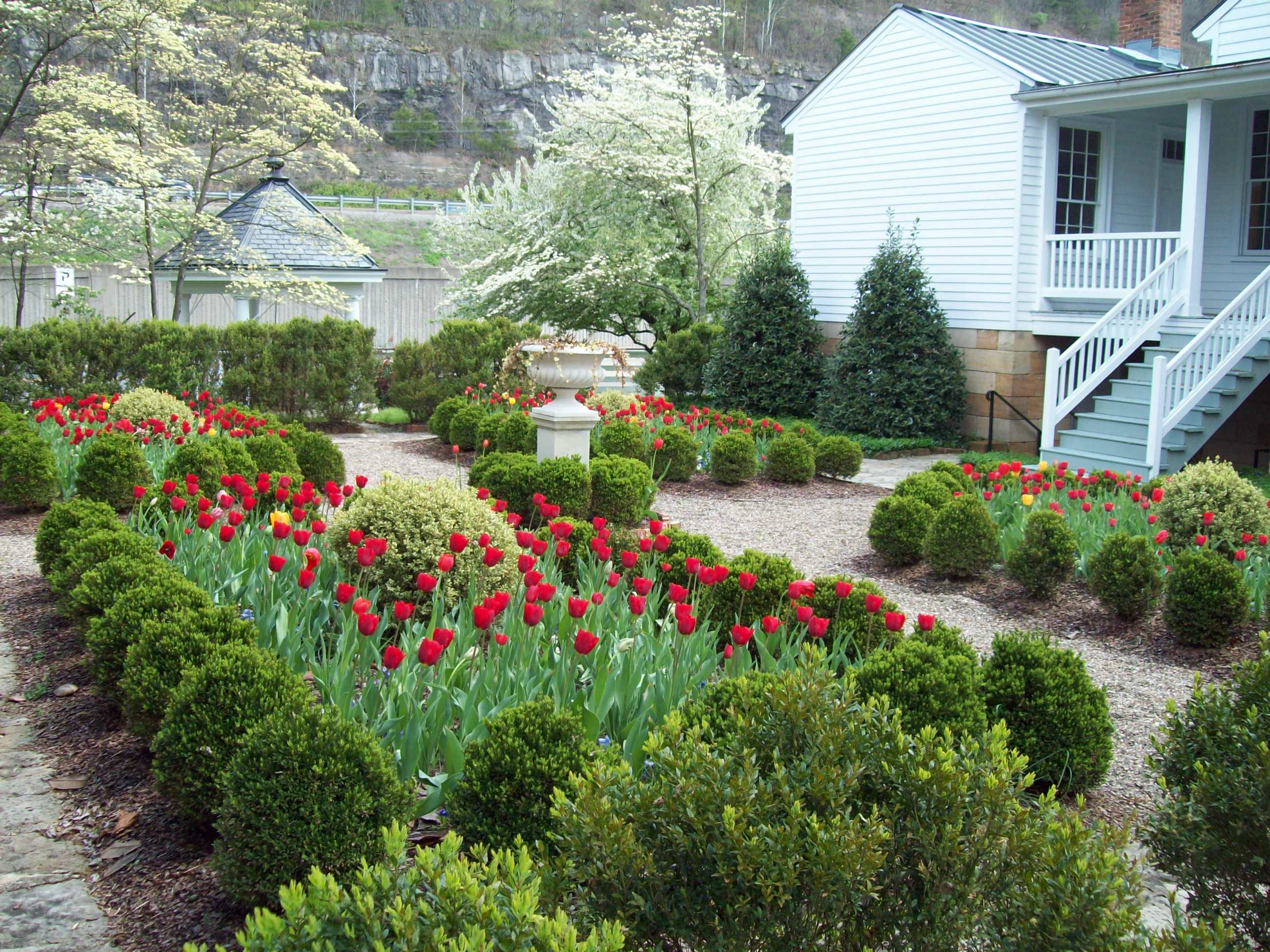
Craik-Patton Garden, April 2009

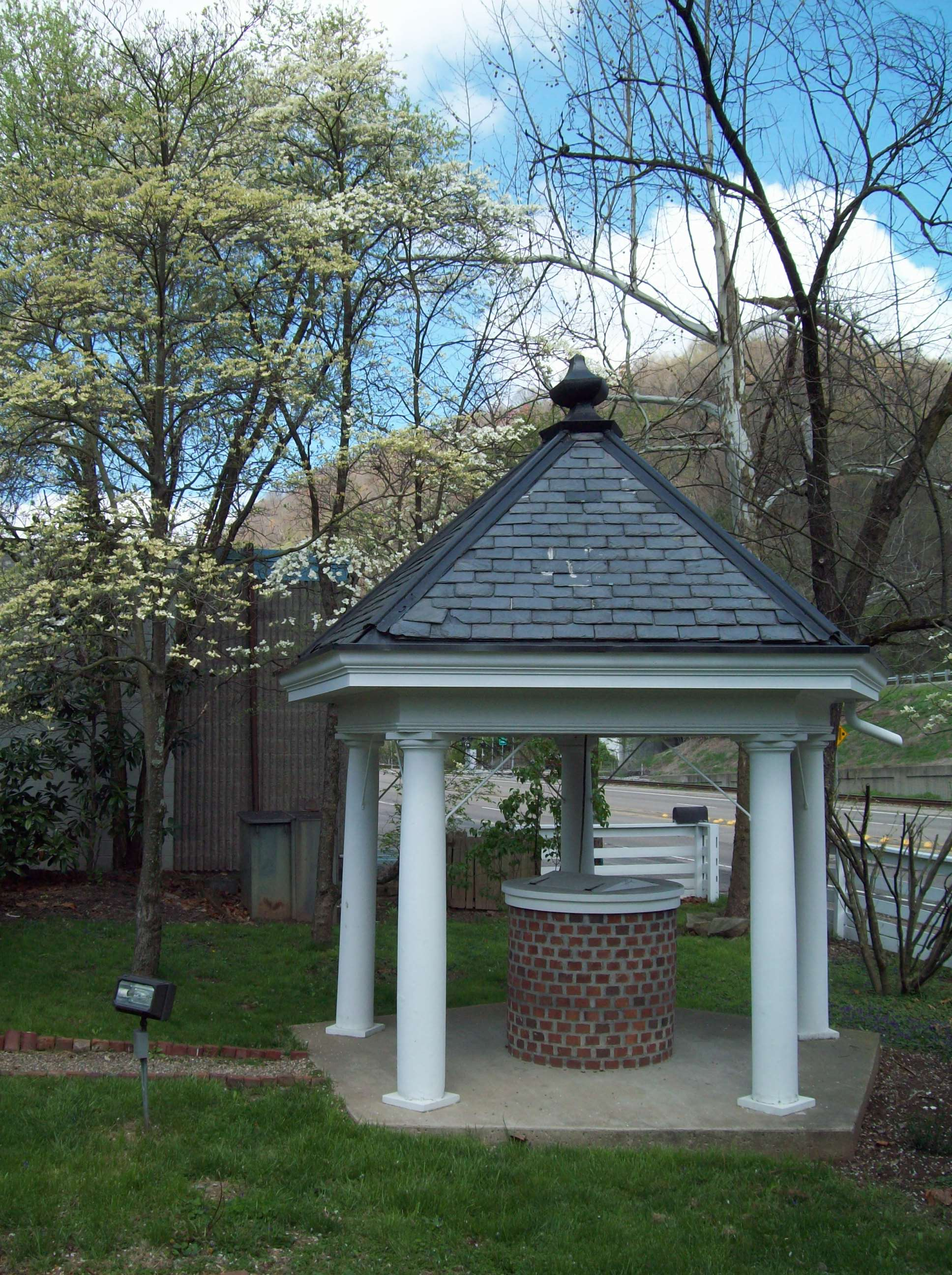
Craik-Patton Well House, April 2009
