= James Craik =

Scottish-American physician

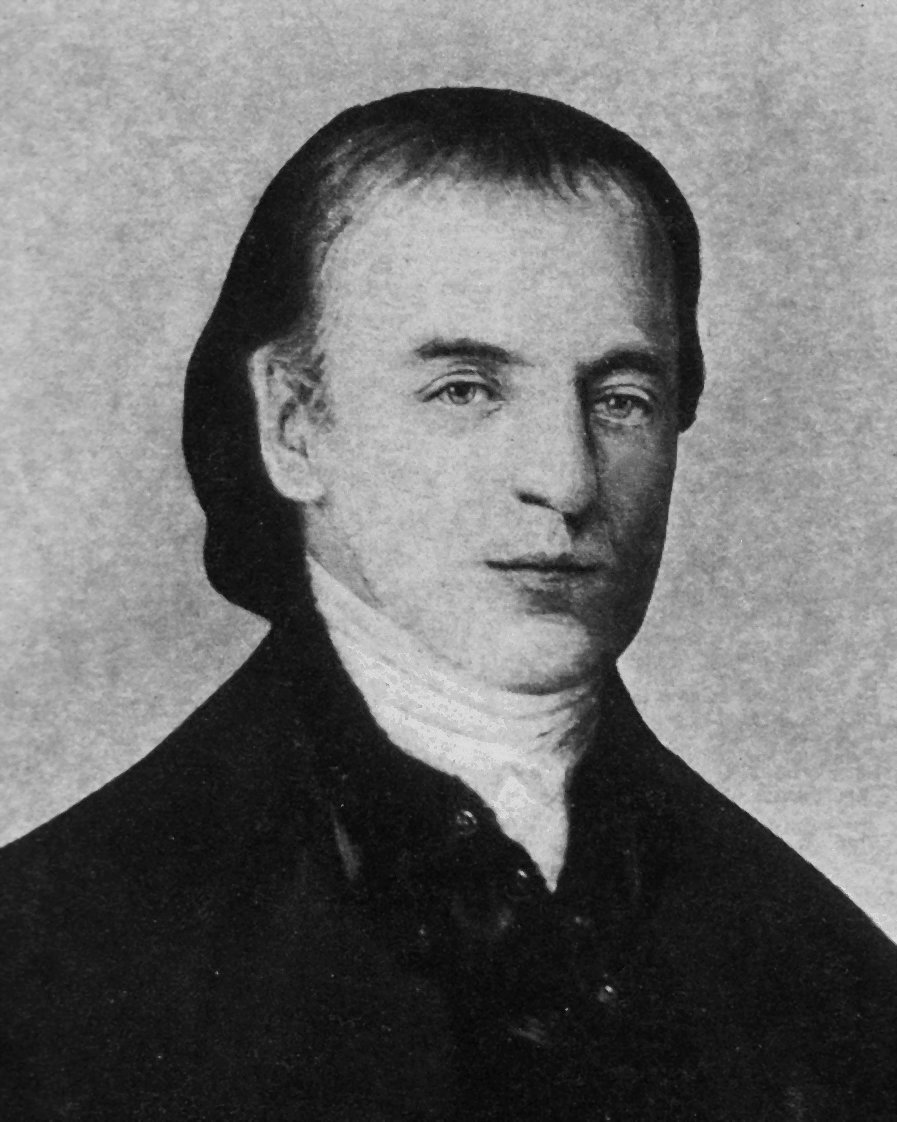
- Born: 1727; Arbigland, Scotland
- Died: 6 February 1814 (aged 86–87); Alexandria, Virginia
- Military career
- Allegiance: United States of America
- Branch: United States Army
- Commands: Physician General of the United States Army

James Craik (/kreɪk/; c. 1727—6 February 1814) was Physician General (precursor of the Surgeon General) of the United States Army, as well as George Washington's personal physician and close friend.

== Biography ==
=== Education and emigration to America ===
Born on the estate of Arbigland in the parish of Kirkbean, County of Kirkcudbright, Scotland, Craik was the illegitimate son of William Craik, 1703 -1798, an agricultural pioneer and landowner. His half-sister, Helen, writes that he was about six years old at the time of his father's marriage in 1733. He studied medicine at the University of Edinburgh, then joined the British Army after graduation and served as an army surgeon in the West Indies until 1751. Craik then opened up a private medical practice in Norfolk, Virginia, and shortly thereafter relocated to Winchester, Virginia.

=== French and Indian War career ===
On 7 March 1754, Craik resumed his military career, accepting a commission as a surgeon in Colonel Joshua Fry's Virginia Provincial Regiment. While with this force, he became good friends with George Washington, at that time a lieutenant colonel in the regiment. Craik saw a great deal of action in various battles of the French and Indian War. He fought at the Battle of the Great Meadows and participated in the surrender of Fort Necessity, then accompanied General Edward Braddock on Braddock's unsuccessful attempt to recapture the region in 1755, treating Braddock's ultimately fatal wounds. Craik then served under Washington in actions in Virginia and Maryland, during various engagements with Indians.

=== Between the wars ===
After the war's end, Craik opened another medical practice at Port Tobacco, Maryland, and on 13 November 1760, he married Mariamne Ewell at her family's estate, Bel Air, located in Prince William County, Virginia. Marriamne would later become the great-aunt of Richard S. Ewell. They had six sons and three daughters. In 1760, he moved to Charles County, Maryland, where in 1765, he built La Grange near La Plata, Maryland. In both 1770 and 1784, he went on surveying expeditions with Washington, examining military claims in Pennsylvania and what is now West Virginia.

=== Revolutionary War career ===
With the outbreak of hostilities during the American Revolution, Craik joined the Revolutionary forces. He served as an army surgeon, ultimately advancing to the second-highest post in army medicine. Craik warned Washington about the plots of the Conway Cabal, and treated the wounds of General Hugh Mercer at the Battle of Princeton and Gilbert du Motier, Marquis de La Fayette at the Battle of Brandywine. Mercer died of his wounds, but La Fayette was more fortunate.

At the conclusion of the war, Craik was admitted as an original member of The Society of the Cincinnati of Maryland.

Washington persuaded him to move his practice to Alexandria, Virginia, where he built his house Vaucluse, where he later died. He also had a town house at 117 South Fairfax Street, 209 Prince Street, and then 210 Duke Street.

Washington summoned Craik out of private practice in 1798 in connection with the Quasi-War against France, installing him as Physician General of the Army on 19 June of that year. After the conclusion of hostilities, Craik mustered out on 15 June 1800.

His grandson, who was named after him, would build his house Elm Grove, later renamed the Craik-Patton House, on a tract of land awarded to Dr. Craik as payment for his service in the Revolutionary War. The town of James Craik, Córdoba Province, Argentina is named after him.

=== At Washington's death ===
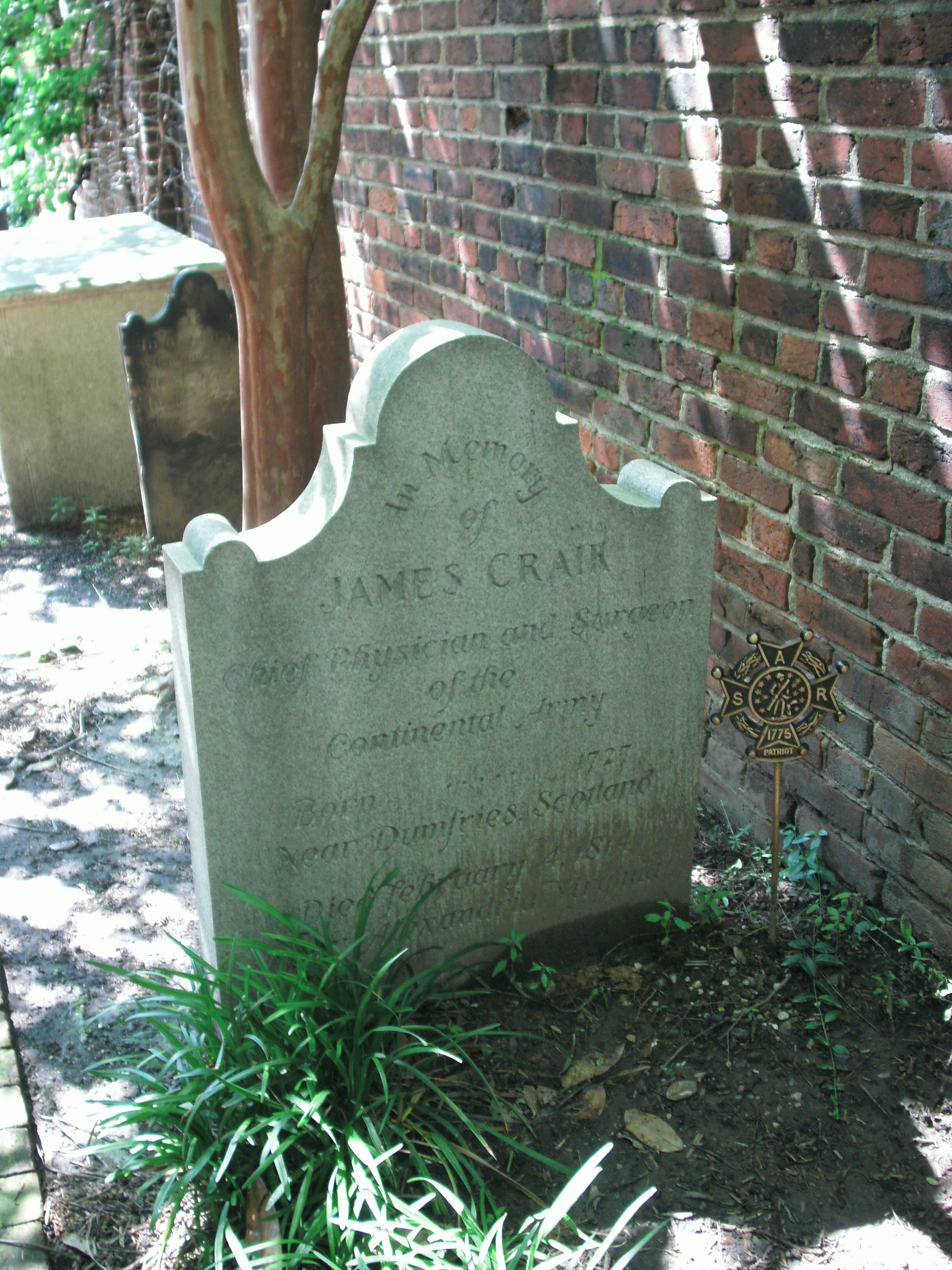
Dr. Craik's grave marker, in the Old Presbyterian Meeting House cemetery

As Washington's personal physician, Craik was one of three doctors to attend on him during his final illness on 14 December 1799. Washington complained of respiratory distress, described by Craik as "cynanche trachealis". When Washington proved unable to swallow medicines orally, Craik and the other two physicians (Dr. Elisha C. Dick and Dr. Gustavus Richard Brown) treated his condition with bloodletting, the application of various poultices, and a rectal solution of calomel and tartar. Washington's condition continued to deteriorate, but Craik and Brown decided against Dick's suggestion of a tracheotomy (which might have been lifesaving, but likely would have spread the infection and caused sepsis), and Washington died at 10:10 p.m. Brown and Craik co-published an account of their treatment in December 1800.

Craik died in Alexandria in 1814; he is buried in the graveyard of the Old Presbyterian Meeting House in that city.

== Sources ==
- Pilcher, James Evelyn.: The Surgeon Generals of the Army of the United States of America: A Series of Biographical Sketches of the Senior Officers of the Military Medical Service from the American Revolution to the Philippine Pacification (1905)pp. 21–24
- "James Craik", The United States Office of Medical History, Retrieved 20 May 2006.
- Custis, George Washington Parke, Recollections of Washington (1860)
- "A Physician Looks At The Death of Washington", Vibul V. Vadakan, M.D., Early American Review, Retrieved 20 December 2008.
- James Craik, Office of Medical History, Surgeon General
- Letters of his daughter Helen Craik in "Farmer's Magazine – A Periodical Work Exclusively Devoted to Agriculture and Rural Affairs," published in Edinburgh in 1811.
