= Guyasuta =

Seneca Chief and diplomat

- Gayáhso꞉dö’
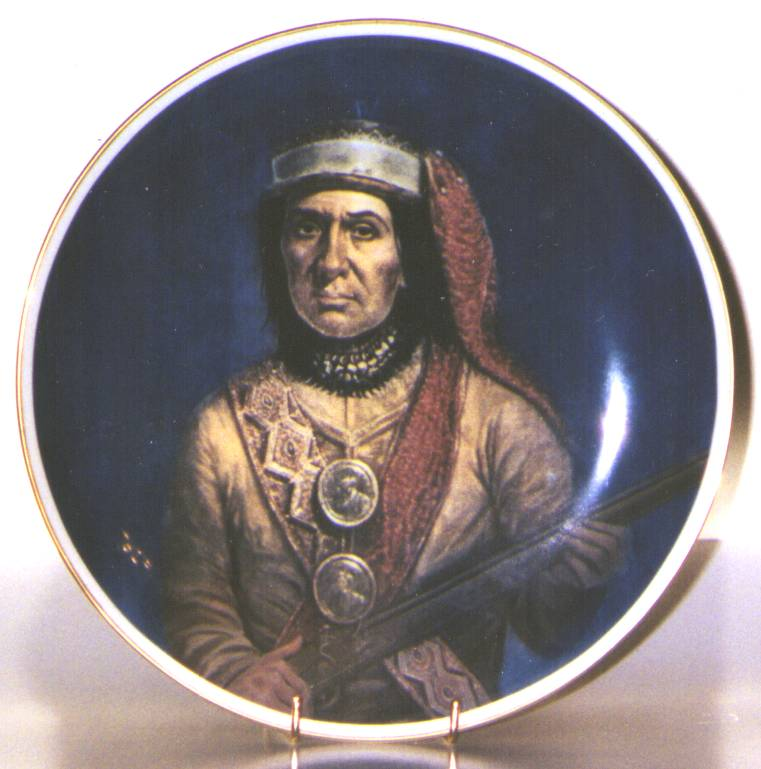
- Portrait of Guyasuta, late 18th century

Seneca leader

Personal details
- Born: c.1725 Western New York
- Died: c.1794 (aged 68–69) O'Hara estate near Sharpsburg, Pennsylvania
- Resting place: Disputed
- Relations: Cornplanter (nephew); Handsome Lake (nephew)

Military service
- Battles/wars: French and Indian War; Battle of the Monongahela; Battle of Fort Duquesne; Battle of Loyalhanna; Pontiac's Rebellion; Capture of Fort Venango; Siege of Fort Pitt; Battle of Bushy Run; American Revolutionary War; Siege of Fort Stanwix; Battle of Oriskany; Siege of Fort Henry (1782)

Guyasuta (Note: Spelling variations include Guyashuta, Guyasoota, Guy-a-soot-er, Guyasootha, Guyasotha, Guyasutha, Giosodo, Kayashota, Kayasota, Kayasutha, Keyashuta, Kiasota, Kiashuta, Kiasutha, Kiosola, Kiyashuta, and Kyasoota.) /ˌɡaɪəˈsuːtə/ (c. 1725–c. 1794; Seneca: Gayáhso꞉dö’, "standing crosses", or Kayahsotaˀ, "he stands up to the cross" or "he sets up the cross") was an important Native American leader of the Seneca people in the second half of the eighteenth century, playing a central role in the diplomacy and warfare of that era. Although he became friends with George Washington in 1753, he sided with the French against Britain during the French and Indian War and fought against the British in Pontiac's War. He later supported the British during the American Revolutionary War. In his final years, he engaged in peacemaking to end the Northwest Indian War.

== Early life and family ==
Born in a Mingo community in upstate New York, probably on the Genesee River, he and his family migrated along the Allegheny River and after 1725 they settled in Logstown, a mostly-Haudenosaunee village in Pennsylvania. Guyasuta was a maternal uncle to Cornplanter and Handsome Lake. He was distantly related to Governor Blacksnake and Red Jacket.

Guyasuta married twice and had six sons, of whom very little is known. He is reported to have sent one of his sons to Philadelphia "to learn English, to be an interpreter." In August 1762 the boy was returned to his family.

== Journey with Washington, 1753 ==
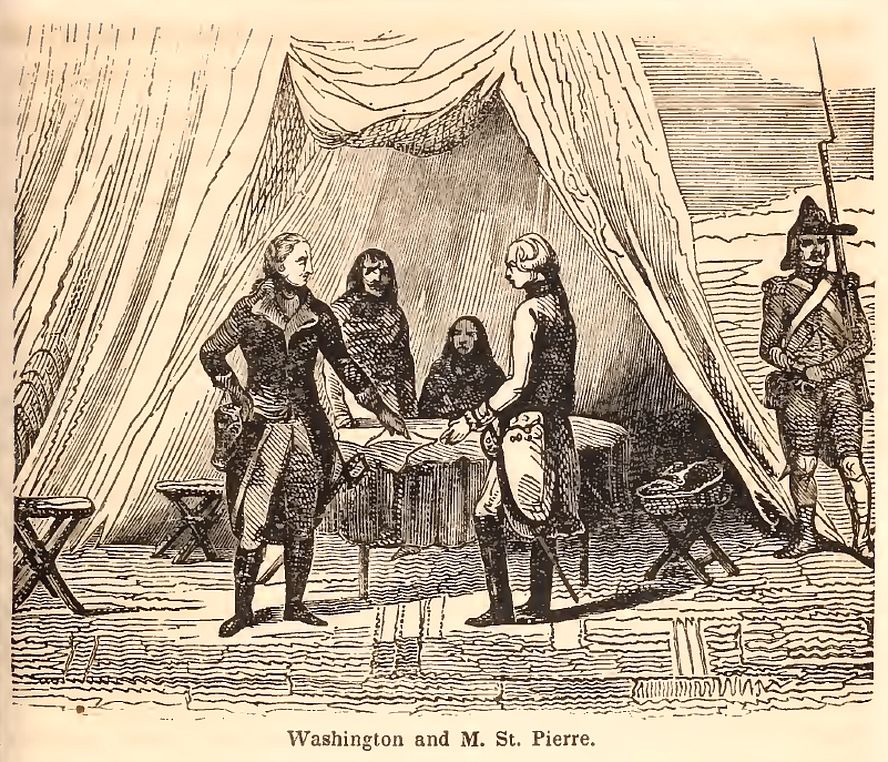
George Washington (left) meeting with French military commander Jacques Legardeur de Saint-Pierre at Fort Le Boeuf in 1753. In the background are Tanacharison and another Indian from Logstown, possibly Guyasuta.

Guyasuta first appears in colonial records when he met the 21-year-old George Washington, who had been assigned to deliver a message to the French commandant at Fort Leboeuf. In late 1753, Virginia Governor Dinwiddie appointed newly-commissioned Major Washington as a special envoy to demand that the French vacate the Ohio Country, which the British had claimed. Arriving with Christopher Gist in Logstown on November 23, Washington held council with Native American leaders, including Shingas, Scarouady, and Tanacharison. Washington explained his mission and received assurances that the Indians and the English "were brothers." Tanacharison told Washington that "he cou’d not consent to our going without a Guard, for fear some Accident shou’d befall us," and volunteered to accompany Washington, along with Kaghswaghtaniunt (White Thunder), Guyasuta, and Jeskakake. Their purpose was to return three belts of wampum sent by the French as a symbol of friendship. Returning the wampum was a gesture intended to show that the sachems at Logstown were allied with the English. Washington wrote in his diary that "I knew that returning of Wampum was the abolishing of Agreements; & giving this up was shaking of all Dependence upon the French." Guyasuta referred to George Washington as "Tall Hunter," and is referred to as "The Hunter," and "one of their best Hunters," in Washington's journal, Journey to the French Commandant.

Washington and his men left Logstown on November 30 and reached Venango at French Creek on December 4, where they were warmly greeted by Philippe-Thomas Chabert de Joncaire, who was in command of the French troops at Venango. Joncaire provided Washington's men with wine and brandy, and when intoxicated, Washington's Native American companions, including Guyasuta, declared their loyalty to the French. It took Washington three days to persuade them to move on to Fort Le Boeuf, where they met the French commander Jacques Legardeur de Saint-Pierre. Tanacharison tried to return the wampum to Saint-Pierre, "who evaded taking it, & made many fair Promises of Love & Friendship; said he wanted to live in Peace & trade amicably with them; as a Proof of which, he wou’d send some Goods immediately down to the Logstown for them. As they prepared to leave, White Thunder was injured, and Tanacharison decided to stay with him, sending Guyasuta to accompany Washington and Gist, but as Washington's horses were slowed down by baggage, Washington and Gist left them with Guyasuta and a driver and proceeded on foot. Guyasuta returned with Tanacharison to Logstown on January 15, 1754.

== French and Indian War ==
=== Battle of the Monongahela ===
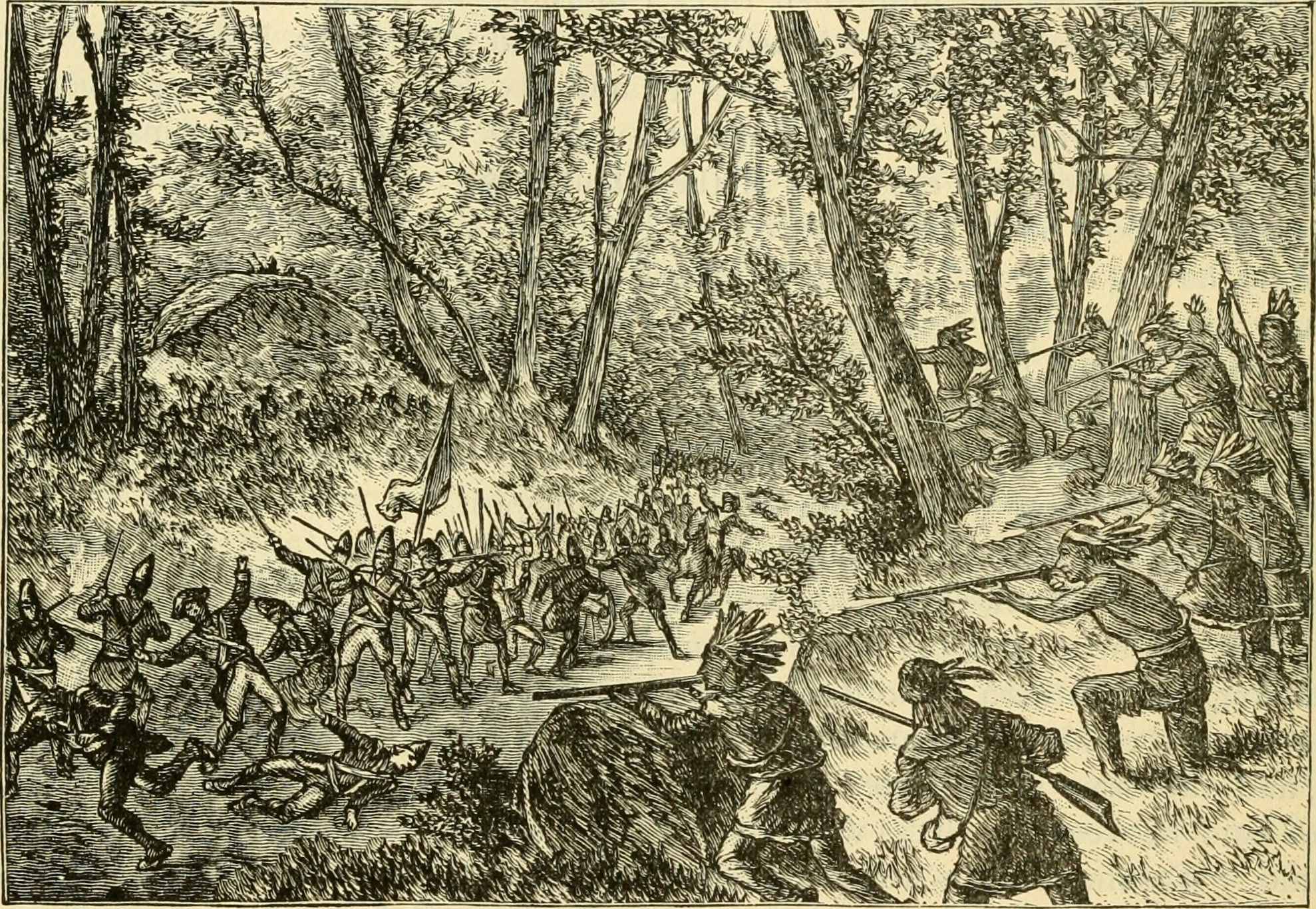
Native American warriors attacking British troops at the Battle of the Monongahela

In July 1755, as the Braddock Expedition marched towards Fort Duquesne, the French recruited Native American warriors, including Odawas, Ojibwes, Mississaugas, and Ohio Valley Indians including Guyasuta, to assist in its defense. General Claude-Pierre Pécaudy de Contrecœur felt that the warriors would be less effective in or near the fort, and instead deployed them in the open forests south of the fort, where their rifles could hit targets at long range while the Indians fired from behind rocks and trees. The British were unable to employ traditional volley fire tactics and were routed. When Guyasuta met Washington again in Ohio in October 1770, the warrior described how he had attempted to shoot Washington twice on the field of battle, and both times something had mysteriously deflected his bullet.

=== Delegation to Montreal ===
Guyasuta was recognized for his participation in the victory, and in late 1755 was selected to lead a party of twenty Senecas to visit Montreal accompanied by Philippe-Thomas Chabert de Joncaire, who served as interpreter. At the Château Vaudreuil the Indians were received in the council chamber with much ceremony by the Governor General of Canada, the Marquis de Vaudreuil. Guyasuta, chief and orator of the Senecas, addressed Vaudreuil, seeking a formal alliance with the French. The delegation remained in Montreal until the following spring.

=== Adoption of Simon Girty ===
In August 1756, Guyasuta participated in the capture of Fort Granville, taking captive 22 soldiers, 3 women, and 5 or 6 children, among whom were 15-year-old Simon Girty, his three brothers, and his mother and stepfather. Simon Girty was adopted by Guyasuta and lived with him until 1764, when by arrangement with Colonel Henry Bouquet, over 200 white captives were handed over to British authorities. On November 14 1764, Guyasuta took Girty to Bouquet's camp on the Muskingum River and handed him over directly to Lieutenant Alexander McKee, assistant deputy agent for the British Indian Department. Having learned nine Native American languages during his years with the Seneca, Girty became an interpreter for the British Army and, in this role, encountered Guyasuta frequently during negotiations.

=== Battle of Fort Duquesne ===
In September 1758, Guyasuta was again called to defend Fort Duquesne when the Forbes Expedition arrived. A reconnaissance force under Major James Grant had gone ahead, and Grant decided to attack the fort, thinking that the garrison would be easily overcome. Instead, in the ensuing Battle of Fort Duquesne, French marines and Native American warriors overwhelmed Grant's troops, capturing him. James Smith described the battle:

"The French and Indians knew not that Grant and his men were there until they beat the drum and played upon the bagpipes, just at daylight. They then flew to arms, and the Indians ran up under cover of the banks of Allegheny and Monongahela, for some distance, and then sallied out from the banks of the rivers, and took possession of the hill above Grant; and as he was on the point of it in sight of the fort, they immediately surrounded him, and as he had his Highlanders in ranks, and in very close order, and the Indians scattered, and concealed behind trees, they defeated him with the loss only of a few warriors; most of the Highlanders were killed or taken prisoners."

Guyasuta's warriors decapitated the bodies of Grant's highlanders and impaled the heads on stakes in front of the fort.

=== Battle of Loyalhanna ===
In October 1758, Guyasuta led a force of warriors in the Battle of Loyalhanna, together with 450 French troops under the command of Charles Philippe Aubry and 150 Lenape led by Keekyuscung, but the British, under the command of Colonel James Burd, repulsed the attack.

=== Peace conference at Fort Pitt, 1759 ===
In July 1759, Guyasuta, two other chiefs and sixteen warriors of the Six Nations, along with a number of Lenape, Shawnee and Wyandot leaders, attended a conference at Pittsburgh with George Croghan, William Trent, Colonel Hugh Mercer, and the officers of Fort Pitt. At this conference the terms of the 1758 Treaty of Easton were reaffirmed, and the tribal leaders promised to hand over captives taken during the French and Indian War. Guyasuta became close friends with George Croghan at this conference, a relationship which they maintained for many years. Croghan once referred to Guyasuta as "a Sencable good Tempered Indian."

== Pontiac's War ==
Guyasuta was a major player in Pontiac's Rebellion—indeed, some historians once referred to that war as the Pontiac–Guyasuta War. As early as 1761 he and Seneca war chief Tahaiadoris were circulating a large red wampum belt, known as the war hatchet, among the Native American communities near Detroit. According to Sir William Johnson's deputy, George Croghan, the purpose was to bring on a general uprising, which appeared imminent. Croghan learned that Guyasuta and Tahaiadoris were planning to incite the tribes around Detroit, the Odawa, Potawatomi, and Wyandot, to surprise the garrison there and take over the fort, giving their warriors access to abundant stores of guns and ammunition. Next, the nations in the Ohio River Valley, the Lenape, Shawnee, and Miami (Twightwee), would attack the smaller forts around Fort Pitt. The Mingo and other League members would attack and capture the French-built forts of Presque Isle, Fort Le Boeuf, and Fort Venango. Finally, the Haudenosaunee Six Nations Confederacy would cut communications between Fort Niagara, Oswego, and the Mohawk Valley. With these communication and supply routes secured, the major military posts at Niagara and Fort Pitt could be starved into surrender, as the Native Americans were not inclined to try to take these forts by force, being unaccustomed to siege warfare.

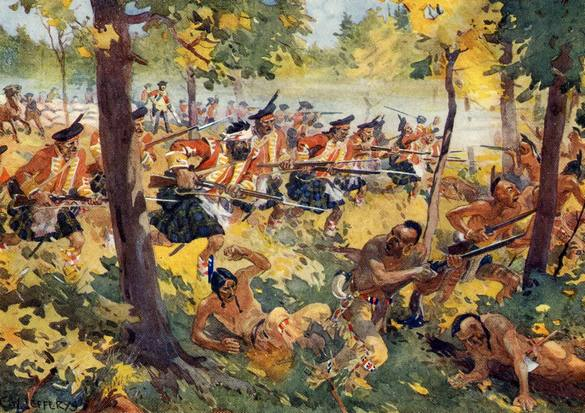
Highlanders charge at the Battle of Bushy Run.

This scheme assumed that the French would support the uprising with weaponry and hopefully troops. Guyasuta and Tahaiadoris also suggested forming an alliance with the Cherokee, who were traditional enemies of the Haudenosaunee. Guyasuta's interpreter revealed the plot to the commander at Fort Detroit, and an Odawa chief confirmed the allegation, identifying Guysuta as the "bad bird among us." Guyasuta confessed his involvement in the scheme to Croghan several years later.

Guyasuta and Tahaiadoris visited several of the Ohio Valley tribes and sent wampum war belts to tribes in the Illinois country, trying to convene a war conference in Sandusky, but many tribal leaders were skeptical of their plan. Native American communities were still recovering from the French and Indian War and were not ready to make enemies of the British and their powerful armies. Even Jeffery Amherst, Commander-in-Chief of the Forces in the British Army, dismissed the scheme, doubting that the tribes could coordinate such a massive and complex operation. But Amherst then began implementing policies that increased tension among Native Americans. He demanded that captives be returned and that Native Americans accused of committing crimes against white settlers be tried and punished according to British law. He also severely restricted the quantity and types of goods to be sold or given to the Indians, particularly firearms and alcohol. Amherst was opposed to the practice of gift-giving, a traditional part of Native American alliances, as he felt this supported a "culture of dependency." This created a wave of anger and resentment that Pontiac exploited in 1763, after it was announced that France had signed a peace treaty with Britain and the Pays d'en Haut would come under British control, contrary to previous British promises to leave the region.

Although the Seneca remained neutral during the war, Guyasuta and other Seneca warriors took part in the capture of Fort Venango, gaining entrance to the fort by pretending to be unarmed and friendly. A few days later, Guyasuta and his warriors joined in the assault on Fort Presque Isle and then participated in the siege of Fort Pitt. When Colonel Henry Bouquet arrived with a relief column, Guyasuta joined Lenape and Shawnee warriors in trying to prevent it from reaching the fort. They were defeated at the Battle of Bushy Run. (Note: Guyasuta's participation in the Battle of Bushy Run is disputed: Historian Paul A. W. Wallace states that the Seneca warriors were led by Gaustarax, not Guyasuta.) Guyasuta signed a preliminary peace agreement on August 12 1764, and participated in the handover of captives, including his own adopted son, Simon Girty.

== Peace conference at Fort Pitt, 1765 ==
On May 10 1765, Guyasuta attended a peace conference at Fort Pitt to discuss the resumption of trade relations between Pennsylvania and the Western Indians after Pontiac's War. He was one of the principal speakers on this occasion, and represented the Senecas. He made a speech which summarizes the distrust and frustration most Native Americans felt after inconsistent treatment by the British government:

""When you first came to drive the French from this place, the Governor of Pennsylvania sent us a Message that we should withdraw from the French, & that when the English was settled here, we should want for nothing. It's true, you did supply us very well, but it was only while the War was doubtful, & as soon as you conquer'd the French you did not care how you treated us, as you did not then think us worth your Notice; we request you may not treat us again in this manner, but now open the Trade and do not put us off with telling us you must first hear from your great man before it can be done. If you have but little goods, let us have them for our skins, and let us have a part of your rum, or we cannot [rely] on what you tell us for the future."

== Meeting with George Washington, 1770 ==
In October 1770, Washington was traveling along the Ohio River looking for lands suitable to be given to Virginia veterans in payment for their services. By chance, he found Guyasuta's camp, and the two men had a pleasant reunion just below present-day Pond Creek, West Virginia. Washington later wrote:

"In the Person of Kiashuta I found an old acquaintance...He expressd a satisfaction in seeing me and treated us with great kindness, giving us a Quarter of very fine Buffalo. He insisted upon our spending that Night with him, and...thankd me for saying that Peace & friendship was the wish of the People of Virginia (with them) & for recommending it to the Traders to deal with them upon a fair & equitable footing; and then again express'd their desire of having a Trade opend with Virginia, & that the Governor thereof might not only be made acquainted therewith, but of their friendly disposition towards the white People."

In October 1774, Guyasuta, passing through Philadelphia while on a mission from the tribes in the Illinois and Ohio country to Guy Johnson, superintendent of Indian affairs for the northern British Indian Department, encountered Washington, who was in the city for the First Continental Congress.

== Meetings with David McClure and Sir William Johnson, 1772 ==
The failure of Pontiac's War led Guyasuta, and other Native American leaders, to understand that negotiating with the white man had the potential to improve trade relations and confer some protection, as long as Native Americans adopted ways that Europeans regarded as "civilized." Accordingly, Guyasuta purchased fine clothes and a carriage, and began to learn English, using Simon Girty as his interpreter until he became fluent in 1775. He traveled to cities in Pennsylvania and New York, went to scientific presentations, and promoted values and ideas he knew would be respected by colonial Americans.

On August 18 1772, he met by chance with the newly-ordained Presbyterian missionary David McClure, on a Pennsylvania road. McClure was on his way to preach to the Lenape people, and later described the encounter in his diary:

"Aug. 18. Crossed the Laurel hanning, a pleasant stream which runs through Ligonier, & rode to Col. Proctor's. Here we found Kiahshutah, Chief of the Senecas, on his way to Philadelphia & from thence Sr. Wm. Johnson's, who, as his interpreter Simon Girty informed us, had sent for him...He was dressed in a scarlet cloth turned up with lace, & a high gold laced hat, & made a martial appearance. He had a very sensible countenance & dignity of manners. His interpreter informed him of the business on which we were going. I asked him his opinion of it. He paused a few moments, & replied that he was afraid it would not succeed; for said he, 'the Indians are a roving people, & they will not attend to your instructions; but take courage & make trial. The King of the Delawares & the warriors are now at home, & you will see them.'"

On November 11, the Pennsylvania Gazette reported:

"On Saturday last Kayashuta, the Great Seneca Chief, returned to this city from Johnson Hall, where he has been on a visit to Sir William Johnson, of the greatest Importance to the Colonies. The Entertainment he received, when last here, at seeing a few Electrical Experiments, has so engaged his attention and admiration, that we are informed, his first Enquiry at his Return was, whether he could have another Opportunity of seeing Thunder and Lightning produced by human art? And we hear he is determined to attend Mr. Kinnersley's lectures at the College on Thursday and Friday Evenings next."

== American Revolutionary War ==
At the outset of the American Revolutionary War, Guyasuta sided with the British, like most Haudenosaunee, although he initially argued that the Seneca should remain neutral. At a conference at Fort Pitt in October 1775, Guyasuta offered to help implement the terms of surrender agreed to by the Shawnee at the end of Lord Dunmore's War. At this conference, the American revolutionaries attempted to win Guyasuta to their cause but, he observed that he and other Native American leaders were hesitant, due to ongoing disputes among the rebel representatives. Another conference at Fort Pitt was called in July 1776 to enable Guyasuta, as the representative of the Six Nations in the Ohio and Allegheny valleys, to define his position in the conflict between England and the American colonies. "I am appointed," said Guyasuta, "by the Six Nations to take care of this country...and I desire you will not think of an expedition against Detroit [then in the possession of the British], for, I repeat, we will not suffer an army to pass through our country." Together with General Richard Butler, Guyasuta worked to persuade the Mingo to remain neutral, and in recognition of his services, the Continental Congress awarded him a silver gorget and a colonel's commission. Guyasuta had no illusions that the British would make better allies than the American rebels. He referred to the revolution as "an unnecessary war," adding, "We must be fools indeed to imagine that they regard us or our interest."

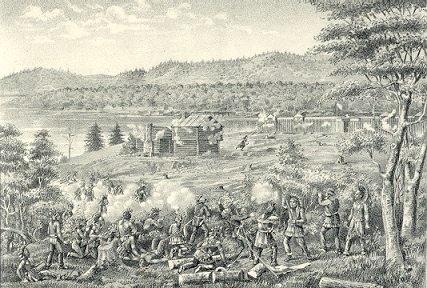
Native American warriors attacking Fort Henry in September 1782

Within a year, however, Guyasuta's stance had changed, and he accompanied his nephew Cornplanter to the Siege of Fort Stanwix, where he took part in the Battle of Oriskany in August 1777. In December 1777, his former adopted son Simon Girty reported that he had killed settlers near Fort Ligonier, as described in a letter from Colonel John Gibson to George Washington: "Simon Girty, a Messenger dispatched by General Hand to the Seneca towns on the Heads of the Allegeney, Returned here a few days agoe, he informs us Guashota a Chief of them had Returned from War, that he had killed four people near Legonier."

In August and September 1779, Lieutenant Colonel Daniel Brodhead directed a series of raids against the Senecas living in southwestern New York State. Brodhead and a contingent of soldiers and militia went from Fort Pitt, up the Allegheny River into New York, intending to drive the Seneca out of their villages. Most of the warriors were away fighting General John Sullivan, and Guyasuta led thirty Seneca warriors to oppose Brodhead. In a brief skirmish at Brokenstraw Creek, five Seneca warriors were killed before they fled. Guyasuta later appeared at Fort Niagara demanding a hundred soldiers to defend Seneca communities, but the British commander refused, and Brodhead's men killed people, destroyed crops and burned over 130 Seneca homes without meeting any resistance.

On July 13 1782, in one of the final actions of the American Revolution, the settlement of Hannastown, Pennsylvania was attacked and destroyed by a British military detachment of sixty Canadian rangers from Fort Niagara and a hundred Seneca warriors led by Guyasuta. The population of the town was alerted by harvesters in the fields and took refuge in a blockhouse while the warriors destroyed the town. Guyasuta continued to raid farms and homesteads in the area for several days afterwards. In September, he led a war party to participate in the second siege of Fort Henry.

== Diplomatic missions, 1787-1793 ==
After the American Revolutionary War, the aging Guyasuta worked to establish peaceful relations with the new United States, as his nephew Cornplanter became an influential diplomatic figure. In 1787, an article in the Maryland Gazette reported that Guyasuta was visiting Philadelphia. Guyasuta was remembered widely for his attack on Hannastown five years earlier, and the sarcastic piece refers to this:

"PITTSBURGH, January 6. We are happy to have an opportunity of congratulating our fellow citizens on the arrival in this town, of the great, the mighty, and the warlike Giosoto the First, king of the Seneca nation; defender of Hannah's-town; protector of the widow and orphan, &c. &c. There was an elegant entertainment (consisting of three gallons of whiskey and twenty pounds of flour) prepared for his majesty and retinue, which they enjoyed with an uncommon relish, as these articles have become exceedingly scarce within his majesty’s, Giosoto, dominions. His majesty amuses himself whilst he remains here, in walking about to view the curiosities of this place, in quaffing good whiskey; and smoaking tobacco and the bark of willow trees, through his curiously ornamented wooden pipe. As anecdotes of great men can never fail to be interesting, we shall not neglect to add, that his majesty was observed to be particularly fond of viewing the game of billiards."

In October 1790, Guyasuta, Cornplanter, Half-Town, Great Tree, and other Seneca leaders went to Philadelphia, staying until March 1791 while they met with federal and state officials to discuss food aid and other assistance for the Seneca people. During their visit, Guyasuta delivered an address to the Quakers of Philadelphia, seeking assistance and addressing them as the sons of "Brother Onas" (a term referring to William Penn):

"When I was young and strong, our country was full of game which the good Spirit sent for us to live upon...Hunting was then not tiresome; it was diversion; it was pleasure. When your fathers asked land from my nation, we gave it to them, for we had more than enough. Guyasuta was among the first people to say, 'give land to our brother Onas for he wants it,' and [Guyasuta] has always been a friend to Onas and his children. But you are too far off to see him. Now he is grown old. He is very old, and he wonders at his own shadow; it has become so little. He has no children to take care of him and the game is driven away by the white people so that the young men must hunt all day long to find game for themselves to eat; they have nothing left for Guyasuta; and it is not Guyasuta only who is become old and feeble, there yet remain about thirty men of your old friends, who, unable to provide for themselves or to help one another, are become poor and are hungry and naked...I have no other friends but you, the children of our beloved Brother Onas."

In March, 1793 Guyasuta and Cornplanter were invited to Legionville, adjacent to the site of Guyasuta's boyhood home of Logstown, to meet with General Anthony Wayne for peace talks, in an attempt to end the Northwest Indian War. As he saw his dream of a peaceful and strong Native American nation crumble, he turned to alcohol.

== Trial of Samuel Brady, 1793 ==
In 1791, Captain Samuel Brady led twenty-five Virginia Rangers in pursuit of twelve Lenape (Delaware), who they said had been raiding white settlements in what was then Virginia and is now West Virginia. On March 9, they found the Indians at a place in Pennsylvania known as the Red Front Trading Post, where they were trading. Brady and his men killed four Lenape men and one Lenape woman, then returned to their Virginia homes. Brady evaded arrest for months until General Anthony Wayne persuaded him to turn himself in. Brady's trial convened in Pittsburgh in May, 1793 and was much publicized. On May 25, Guyasuta entered the courtroom, walking with difficulty, using a walking stick and accompanied by his nephew Cornplanter. On seeing him, Brady and the jurors stood up in respect. Guyasuta took Brady’s hands and addressed the court, announcing that Brady was a good man, that the Indians he killed "rode white men's horses and were not friendly," and that they had hurt the Indians as well as the whites. He added that the Indians were thankful to Brady for saving them from those men. Immediately following this testimony, the jury voted to acquit Brady. After the trial, Brady's attorney expressed his surprise to Guyasuta at the forcefulness of his testimony. Placing his hand on his heart, Guyasuta replied, "Am I not the friend of Brady?"

== Later life and death ==
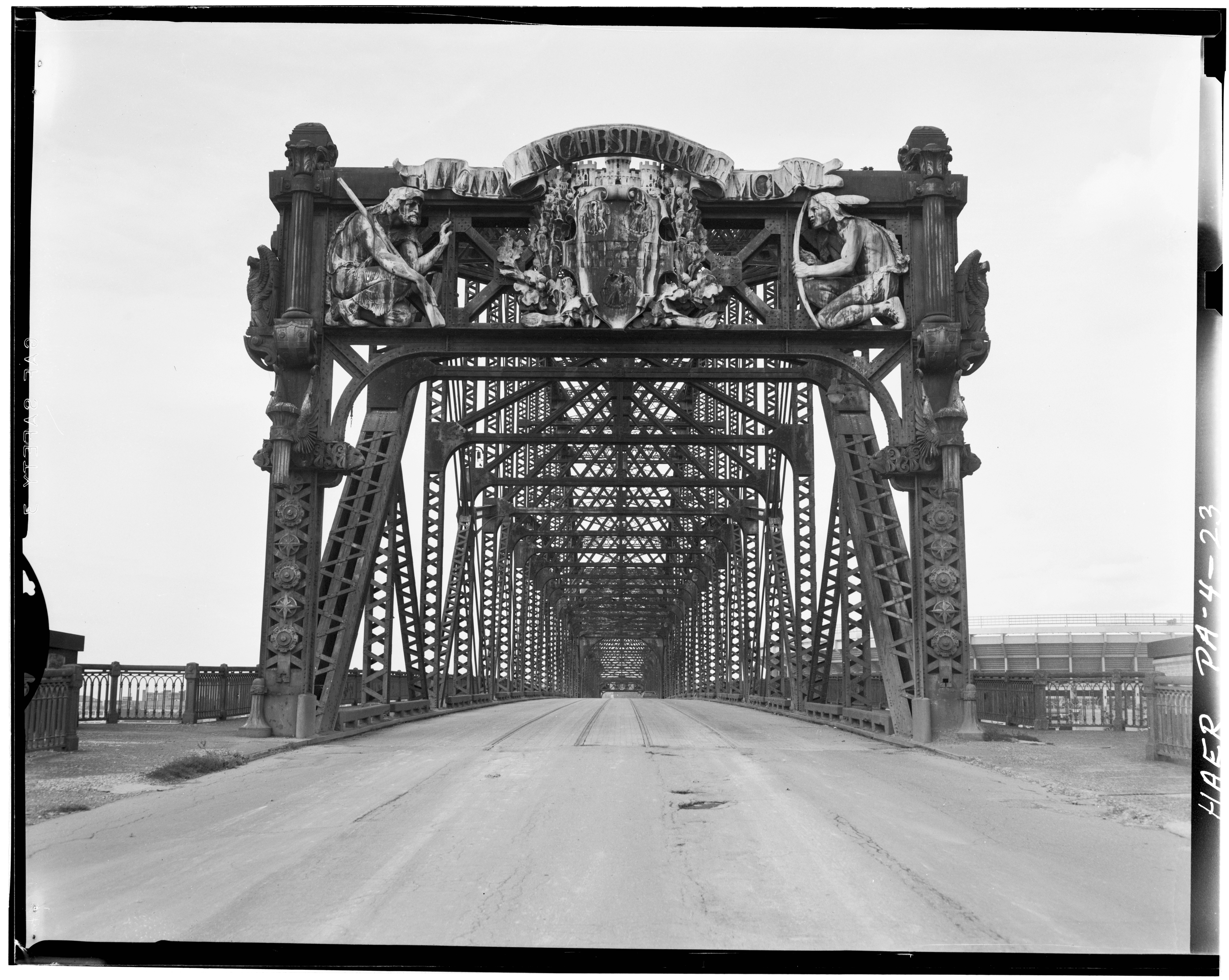
1917 statue of Guyasuta (right) by Charles Keck, on the North Side Point Bridge spanning the Allegheny River at Pittsburgh, before it was dismantled in 1970

Towards the end of his life, Guyasuta lived in poverty in a cabin outside Sharpsburg, Pennsylvania. General James O'Hara purchased much of the land in that area in 1778, and offered Guyasuta a home on his estate, which Guyasuta accepted. Neville B. Craig remembered him as "a stout active man." He was seriously ill by February 1, 1794, when Cornplanter wrote to Isaac Craig: "He is alive & that is all." According to one account, after Guyasuta had not been seen for several days, O’Hara found him dead on his cabin floor in 1794, and he was buried nearby with his rifle, tomahawk, knife, trinkets, and trophies in his coffin.

=== Burial controversy ===
William McCullough Darlington, who later purchased O'Hara's estate, maintained that Guyasuta was buried there, however other sources claim that he was buried on the Cornplanter Tract (near Corydon, Pennsylvania). There is strong evidence that his grave is at Custaloga Town Scout Reservation, now a Boy Scout camp located along French Creek at the former site of Chief Custaloga's village in French Creek Township, Pennsylvania. A stone monument to Guyasuta was erected by Charles William Heydrick near the supposed site of his burial in 1915. The monument stands in a Native American burial ground, owned by the Heydrick family since 1798. The land was donated to the Mercer County Historical Society in 1965. At the burial site is a broken headstone inscribed with "GUY-A-SOOTER 1810," which was the date of Guyasuta's death and burial, according to Charles Heydrick, who spoke to a local settler in 1819:

"John Martin, Jr., who could converse in the Indian tongue, informed me that he made the coffin and assisted in burying a chief. They placed in the coffin his camp kettle, filled with soup; his rifle, tomahawk, knife, trinkets, and trophies. I think they called him 'Guyasooter.'"

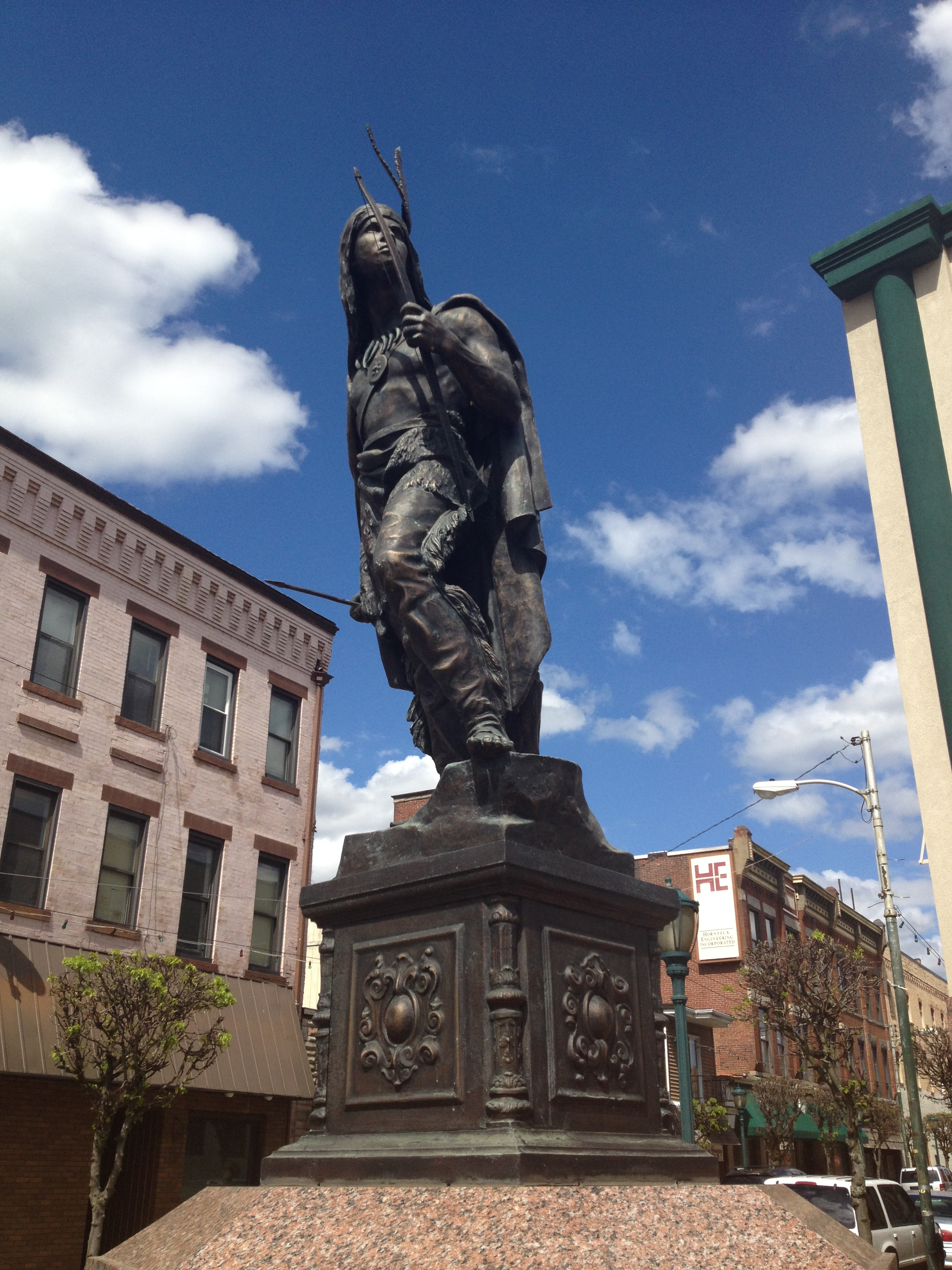
Statue of Guyasuta in the H. J. Heinz Memorial Plaza in Sharpsburg, Pennsylvania

== Memorials and legacy ==
In Pittsburgh, he is honored, along with George Washington, in a large public sculpture by James A. West called Point of View, which overlooks Point State Park. A statue of Guyasuta, sculpted in 1915 by Charles Keck, was part of the North Side Point Bridge, built in 1917 and demolished in 1970. The sculpture was purchased for $1 million by the Pittsburgh History and Landmarks Foundation, which kept it and a matching sculpture of Christopher Gist at the foundation's Pittsburgh headquarters. In 2016 the sculptures were relocated to a plaza on Art Rooney Avenue near Heinz Field.

A statue of Guyasuta stands at the intersection of Main and North Canal Streets in Sharpsburg, Pennsylvania. The statue and a drinking fountain for horses were donated to the city in 1896, as a centerpiece to the H. J. Heinz Memorial Plaza. The fountain and the cast-iron statue were hit by a car and destroyed in 1930, and the original mold was used to make a copy. The fountain was damaged again in the 1980s by a truck, and the statue was replaced with a bronze copy. A brass plaque at the base of the statue states that Guyasuta "was probably buried in the area now occupied by the north end of the Highland Park Bridge."

The Allegheny Reservoir, the artificial lake created by the Kinzua Dam on the Allegheny River, has a beach and camping park named "Kiasutha Recreation Area." Guyasuta Station was the name of the Sharpsburg railroad station, built in 1900. The Laurel Highlands Council of the Boy Scouts of America has a camp property near Sharpsburg named in his honor.

Since 2021, the Heinz History Center has sponsored an exhibit on the life and legacy of Guyasuta, at the Fort Pitt Museum.

=== Popular culture ===
Guyasuta is a prominent character in Calvin Boal's 2013 historical novel, St. George's Cross and the Siege of Fort Pitt: Battle of Three Empires.

He is also a character in The King's Orchard, (1968) a historical novel by Agnes Sligh Turnbull.

Guyasuta was portrayed by Boris Karloff in the 1947 film Unconquered.
