= Half king =

"Half King" or "Half-King" was a title given by American colonists to Native American leaders. These include:

- Dunquat, a Wyandot leader allied with the British during the Revolutionary War whose leadership coincided with the Gnadenhutten massacre and the defeat of William Crawford
- Scarouady, or "Monacatuatha", a Seneca leader who fought with the British at Braddock's defeat in 1755
- Tanacharison, a Seneca leader who helped spark the French and Indian War with George Washington
