= Christopher Gist =

Colonial American explorer (1706–1759)

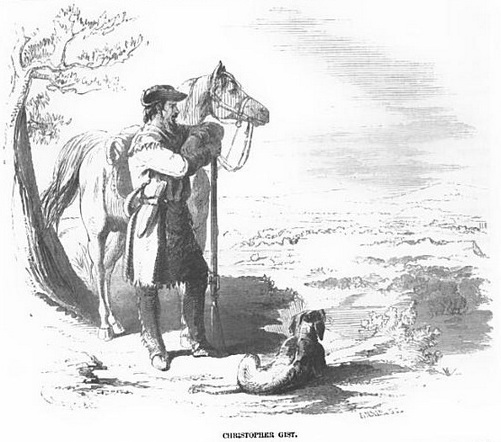
- Drawing (1857) of Gist from Emerson's magazine and Putnam's monthly magazine.
- Born: 1706; Baltimore, Maryland, British America
- Died: 1759 (aged 52–53)

Christopher Gist (1706–1759) was an explorer, surveyor, and frontiersman active in Colonial America. He was one of the first white explorers of the Ohio Country (the present-day states of Ohio, eastern Indiana, western Pennsylvania, and northwestern West Virginia). Gist is credited with providing the first detailed description of the Ohio Country to colonists in the Thirteen Colonies. At the outbreak of the French and Indian War, Gist accompanied Colonel George Washington on missions into this wilderness and saved Washington's life on two occasions.

== Biography ==
=== Early life ===
Born during 1706 in Baltimore, Maryland, Gist is thought to have had little formal education. Historians believe that he received training as a surveyor, more than likely from his father Richard Gist, who helped plot the city of Baltimore. Gist's nephew Mordecai Gist served as a general commanded by Washington during the Revolution.

=== Family ===
Gist married Sarah Howard, a daughter of Joshua Howard of Manchester. Howard served with King James II of England's forces as an officer during the Monmouth Rebellion during 1685, before settling in Baltimore, Maryland. The couple had three sons, Richard (1727–1780) who was killed at the Battle of King's Mountain, Nathaniel who commanded Gist's Additional Continental Regiment of the Continental Army, and Thomas. Christopher's brother Nathaniel Gist married Sarah's sister Mary Howard, and also partnered with Washington and two other veteran soldiers on a prospective land deal during the mid-1750s. The couple also had two daughters, Anne and Violet. Nathaniel might have been the father of Sequoyah, the creator of the Cherokee syllabary.

=== Frontiersman career ===
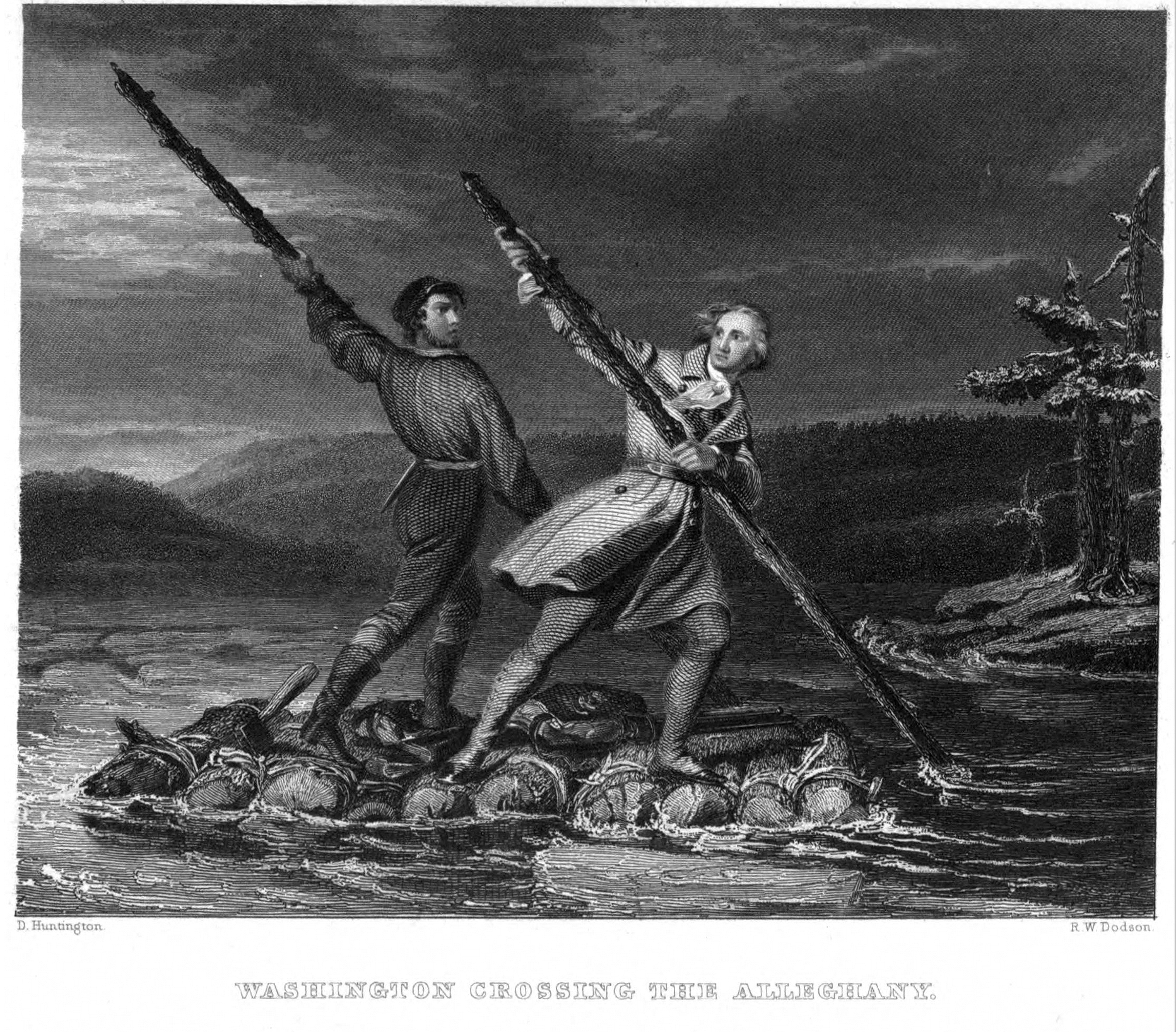
Engraving based on George Washington and Christopher Gist crossing the Allegheny River, attributed to painter Daniel Huntington, mid 19th century.

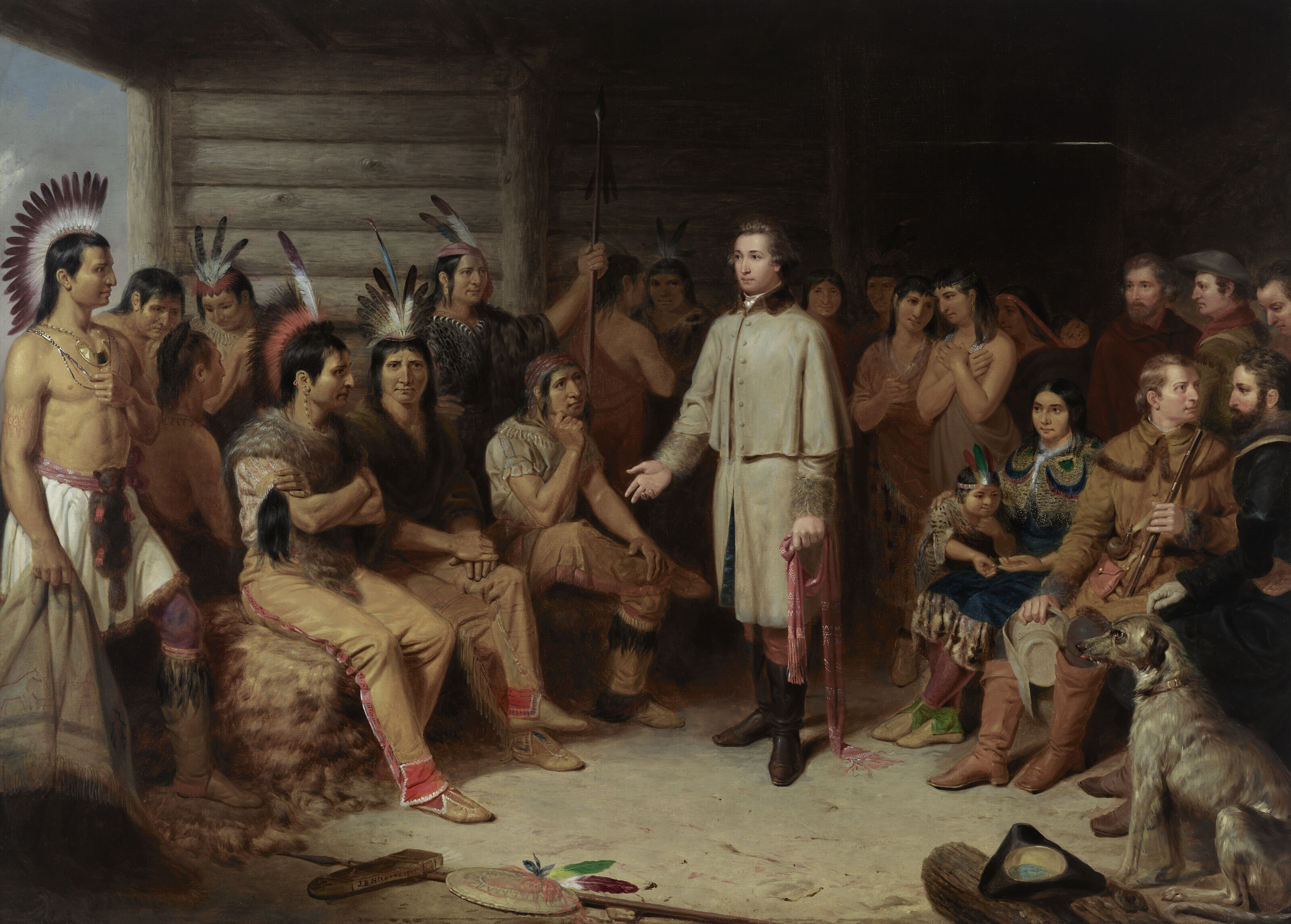
"Washington in the Indian Council," by Junius Brutus Stearns (1847), depicting Washington (standing) and Gist (far right, with rifle) meeting with Shingas, Scarouady, Tanacharison, and other Native American leaders at Logstown in November, 1753.

By 1750 Gist had settled in northern North Carolina, near the Yadkin River. One of his neighbors was the noted frontiersman Daniel Boone. During that same year, the Ohio Company hired Gist, for £150, to explore the country of the Ohio River as far as the Falls of the Ohio, and endear himself to the Native Americans along the way. He was in Muskingum on Christmas Day of 1750 where he celebrated with some local indigenous people a religious ceremony with readings from the Church of England. This is believed to be the first Protestant religious service in the present state of Ohio. That winter Gist mapped the Ohio countryside between the Lenape (Delaware) village of Shannopin's Town, site of present-day Pittsburgh, to the Great Miami River in present-day western Ohio. Gist was received well at Pickawillany when he arrived during February 1751, and strengthened the alliance between the Native American chief Memeskia and British interests against the expanding French colonies. From there he crossed into Kentucky accompanied by a black servant and returned to his home along the Yadkin.

When Gist returned to North Carolina, he found that his family had fled to Roanoke, Virginia, because of Indian attacks. He rejoined them. During the summer of 1751 he again went west to explore the Pennsylvania and western Virginia (present day West Virginia), country south of the Ohio River.

During 1753 Gist again returned to the Ohio Country, this time accompanying George Washington. Robert Dinwiddie, the governor of Virginia, sent Washington to Fort Le Boeuf to deliver a message to the French demanding they leave the Ohio Country. (The French were constructing forts in the Ohio Country to prevent the Thirteen Colonies from expanding there; they ignored Dinwiddie's letter.) Washington took (now Lieutenant) Gist along as his guide. They traveled on the Venango Path through the Ohio Country, stopping at Logstown on their way to the fort. During the trip, Gist earned his place in history by twice saving the young Washington's life: first, from an attempted assault by a hostile Native American; and, second, by pulling Washington from the freezing Allegheny River after Washington had fallen off of a makeshift raft.

=== French and Indian War service ===
During 1754, Washington, Gist, and a detachment of the Virginia Regiment attempted to drive the French from the region. At the Battle of Fort Necessity on July 3, 1754, the French army routed the Virginia militia. This was the beginning of the French and Indian War, a part of the Seven Years' War between France and Britain. Gist owned land near the present city of Uniontown, Pennsylvania. He named it Gist's Plantation and began to build a town there. At the outset of the war, the French burned all the buildings. Gist was a member of the Braddock Expedition during 1755 when it was defeated by the French and their Native American allies.

=== Death ===
During the summer of 1759, Gist contracted smallpox and died in South Carolina or Georgia. Gist's pay for military service with the First Virginia Regiment was paid to his heir, Nathaniel Gist, by 1766. Other reports have him surviving until 1794 and dying in Cumberland, North Carolina, although this narrative may confuse him with a nephew also named Christopher Gist, one of Richard Gist's grandsons through Nathaniel Gist and Mary Howard.

== In popular culture ==
A fictionalized Gist appears as a supporting character in the 2014 action-adventure video game Assassin's Creed Rogue, voiced by Richard Dumont. He is a member of the Templar Order in the American colonies and assists the game's protagonist Shay Patrick Cormac as his second-in-command aboard Cormac's ship, the Morrigan.

Gist is portrayed in the live action 2026 film Young Washington by Leo Hanna. In the film, Gist succumbs to a gunshot wound during the Battle of Fort Necessity

Gist is one of the main characters in the colonial-era historical Western film When the Redskins Rode (1951), where he is played by actor John Ridgely.

== See also ==
- Fort Seybert
