= Logstown =

Logstown Maughwawame
- Historic Native American village
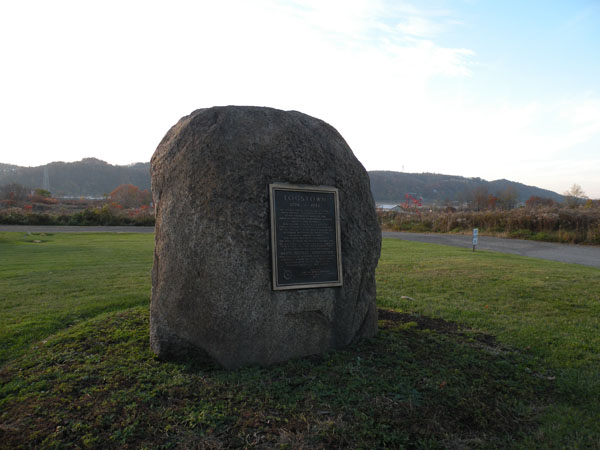
- The stone marker at or near the former site of Logstown (1725–1758)
- Etymology: Unami: maughwawame "extensive flats"
- Location in Beaver County and state of Pennsylvania

- Location of Pennsylvania in the United States
- Coordinates: 40.622942°N 80.226675°W
- State: Pennsylvania
- Present-day Community: Harmony Township, Beaver County, Pennsylvania
- Founded: 1725-1727
- Demolished: June, 1754
- Rebuilt: 1755-58
- Abandoned: November 1758

Population
  - Estimate (1754): 200−500

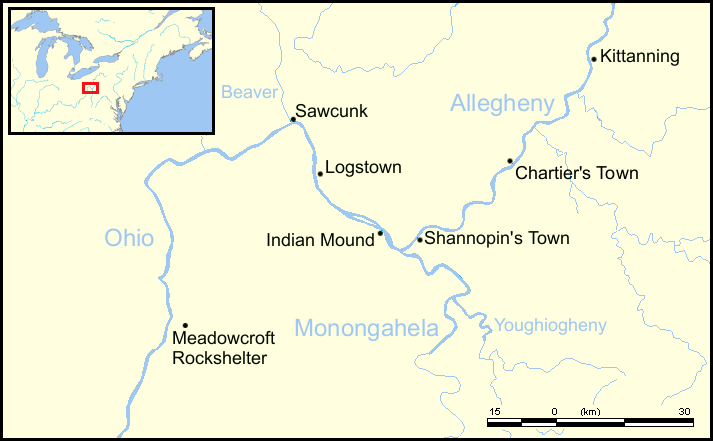
Logstown and other Native American villages, most circa 1750s

The riverside village of Logstown (1726?, 1727–1758) also known as Logg's Town, French: Chiningue (transliterated to Shenango) near modern-day Baden, Pennsylvania, was a significant Native American settlement in Western Pennsylvania and the site of the 1752 signing of the Treaty of Logstown between the Ohio Company, the Colony of Virginia, and the Six Nations, which occupied the region. Being an unusually large settlement, and because of its strategic location in the Ohio Country, an area contested by France and England, Logstown was an important community for all parties living along the Ohio and tributary rivers. Logstown was a prominent trade and council site for the contending British and French colonial governments, both of which made abortive plans to construct forts near the town. Logstown was burned in 1754 and although it was rebuilt, in the years following the French and Indian War it became poor and was eventually abandoned.

== Location ==
Logstown is located in Harmony Township, about 14 miles northwest of the Forks of the Ohio (now in downtown Pittsburgh) in an area on the east bank of the Ohio River opposite Aliquippa. The site is also due north of the Pittsburgh International Airport. Today the site is marked with a stone bearing a brass plaque placed there by the Fort McIntosh chapter of the Daughters of the American Revolution in 1932, memorializing the visit of Major George Washington to the town in November, 1753.

== Etymology ==
A few sources claim that in 1747 the French built about 30 log cabins, some with stone chimneys, on a plateau above the original Logstown village, and that these log cabins supposedly gave the town its name. However, George P. Donehoo says that the name "was probably due to the fact that large numbers of logs were left upon the flat after the floods in the Ohio River."

Donehoo and several other sources report that the original Lenape name of the village was Maughwawame, which translates to "extensive flats."

The French referred to the town as "Chiningue" which Father Joseph Pierre de Bonnecamps notes was their designation and not a Native name: "We called it Chiningue, from its vicinity to a river of that name." Donehoo says that chiningue is a French word for beaver, but also suggests that it may be a corruption of ochenango, a Seneca word meaning "large bull thistles."

== Early history ==
The original village was settled by Shawnees, possibly as early as 1725 or 1730 on low-lying land less than a mile north of present-day Ambridge in Beaver County, Pennsylvania. The population grew as groups of Lenape, Cayugas, Senecas, and Shawnees migrated west into the Ohio River Valley seeking to escape a smallpox epidemic in 1733 and a drought in 1741, creating a multi-ethnic community. In August 1744 the town's population increased significantly when Kakowatcheky arrived with his band of Shawnee warriors and their families from Wyoming Valley, Pennsylvania. Kakowatcheky is sometimes credited with founding Logstown. Another early resident was Opessa Straight Tail, who moved to Logstown some time before 1750. The town's population varied from approximately 200 to 500 people. In 1749 Céloron de Blainville observed fifty cabins housing about sixty warriors, suggesting a population of 200 to 250 total, while in late 1758 George Croghan noted forty houses for about one hundred and twenty warriors, suggesting a total population of 350 to 500.

In late April 1745, the Pekowi Shawnee leader Peter Chartier and about 400 Shawnees, including Meshemethequater and Neucheconeh, stopped at Logstown to visit Kakowatcheky and to try to persuade him to join them. Chartier was angry with the Provincial government of Pennsylvania for their failure to control the sale of alcohol in Shawnee communities, and his plan at that time was to bring as many Shawnees as he could over to French protection. He was on his way to Lower Shawneetown to address the Shawnees living there. Kakowatcheky, however, refused to join him, and Chartier and his people left Logstown after a brief stay.

Most sources agree that the main section of the town was built on the broad, flat floodplain along the east bank of the Ohio River, with a few structures located on the west bank. Gardens and cornfields were planted on both sides of the river, on fertile, alluvial flatlands, where the town's residents cultivated maize, beans, squash, gourds, tobacco, and sunflowers. One source states that "in the year 1752...the Shawanese Inhabited Loggs Town, on the West Side of the Ohio, and tended Corn on the East Side of the River." On the east bank of the river, a few homes were built on a grassy terrace above the floodplain, the so-called "upper town."

In 1747, the Six Nations Confederacy Haudenosaunee sent two headmen as emissaries to live in Logstown and supervise the Haudenosaunee allies: Tanacharison, a Seneca, and Scarouady, an Oneida. Tanacharison oversaw the Delawares and Scarouady supervised the Shawnees.

== Visit by George Croghan, 1748 ==
The provincial government of Pennsylvania was anxious to keep Native Americans in the Ohio Valley from being influenced by the French. As early as 1731, agents from Montreal had visited communities along the Ohio River, distributing goods and urging the tribes to send emissaries to Quebec to establish alliances. On September 18, 1747, George Croghan wrote to Thomas Lawrence in Philadelphia, a member of the Pennsylvania Provincial Council, that one of his men, who had just come "down from ye Woods," had informed him that "the Indians at this side of the Lake Erie are making war very briskly against the French, but is very impatient to hear from their brothers, ye English, expecting a present of powder and lead; which, if they don't get, I am of opinion, by the best accounts, that they will turn to the French." In November 1747 Scarouady and other Haudenosaunee leaders visited Philadelphia to sign the "Treaty Between the President and Council of the Province of Pennsylvania and the Ohio Indians," promising a military alliance against the French in exchange for supplies and trade goods. The Council obtained £200 worth of goods and sent Croghan to Logstown in April, 1748 to cement the terms of the treaty and secure the tribes' loyalty to the British. Conrad Weiser was to follow in August with more gifts. Croghan met in council with 1500 men at Logstown, and finding the Council's gifts insufficient for all of them, he added an additional £224 in powder, lead, knives, flints, brass wire, and tobacco from his own stock. This gesture was influential in maintaining the alliance between the British and the Ohio tribes.

In late July, fifty-five representatives of the Six Nations, Delawares, Shawnees, Nanticokes, and Twightwees met at the courthouse in Lancaster, Pennsylvania and signed a peace treaty with the Pennsylvania Provincial Council. This treaty guaranteed commercial access to tribes across the Ohio Valley as far west as the Wabash River, an unprecedented diplomatic achievement for the English.

== Visit by Conrad Weiser, 1748 ==
In 1748, the colony of Pennsylvania sent Conrad Weiser, Pennsylvania's ambassador to the Six Nations, to Logstown. Arriving on August 27, he set up his headquarters in Croghan's trading post and visited the surrounding villages. Soon a large number of Delaware, Shawnee, Haudenosaunee and Wyandot gathered at Logstown, including the Wyandot chief Orontony and five other leaders from Kuskusky, who "behav’d like People of good Sense & Sincerity." Weiser met each tribe separately and then in a general council he announced that King George's War had ended and that England and France signed a peace treaty. As a result, the English had no more war supplies for them and he distributed gifts instead. The chiefs complied with his request for a count of their warriors in the Ohio Valley region:

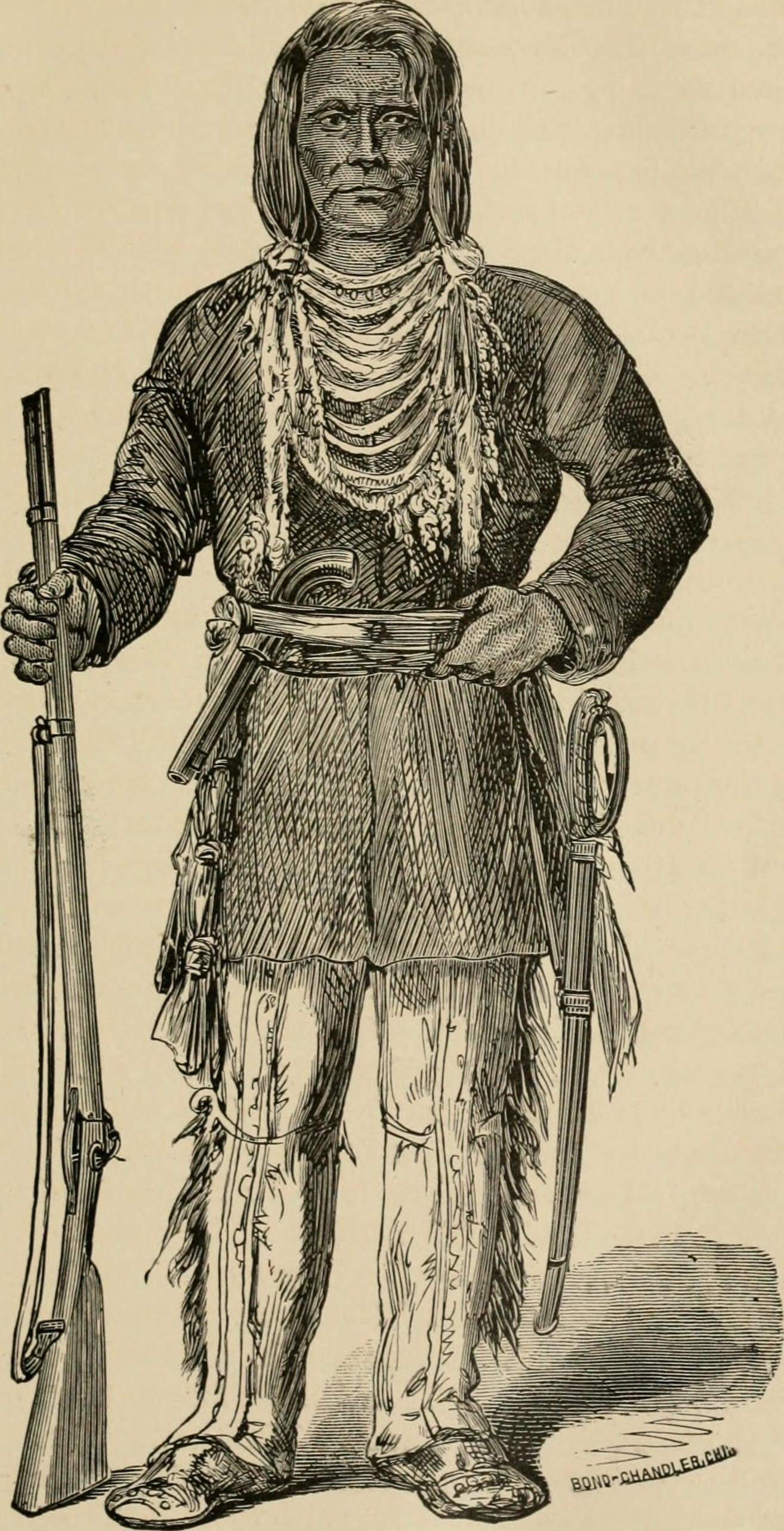
Unnamed Haudenosaunee chief, early 18th century

- Haudenosaunee, or Six Nations:
  - Senecas: 163
  - Onondagas: 35
  - Oneidas: 15
  - Cayugas: 20
  - Mohawks: 74
- Allies of the Haudenosaunee:
  - Wyandots: 100
- Others:
  - Shawnees: 162
  - Tisagechroamis: 40
  - Mohicans: 15
  - Lenape (Delaware): 165
  - Total : 789

Weiser was accompanied by "English traders, of whom there were above twenty," intending to formally establish trade with tribes represented at the council, to create a stronger relationship that would further exclude the French from operating in the region. During the council, a trader from Maryland named Nolan arrived with 30 gallons of rum and began to sell it to the Indians, much to the dismay of Weiser and Croghan, who were afraid that violence would erupt if the Indians drank too much. Several of the Logstown leaders were also unhappy, as they had petitioned the Pennsylvania provincial government as early as 1734 to restrict the sale of alcohol in Native American communities because of the social and economic problems it caused. Croghan eventually decided to break open the kegs and spill the rum, in accordance with a newly-enacted Pennsylvania statute issued by Lieutenant-Governor George Thomas.

After the gifts had been distributed, the chiefs told Weiser and Croghan, "Our brethren the White Men have indeed tied our hearts to theirs. We at present can but return thanks with an empty hand till another opportunity serves to do it sufficiently...In the meantime, look upon us as your true brothers."

Among those accompanying Weiser was Benjamin Franklin's illegitimate son, William Franklin, only nineteen at the time, probably sent by his father as a part of his education. Franklin kept a journal of his trip which Lewis Evans used in making his 1749 map. William's journey subsequently inspired his father's keen interest in the frontier.

== Visit by Céloron de Blainville, 1749 ==
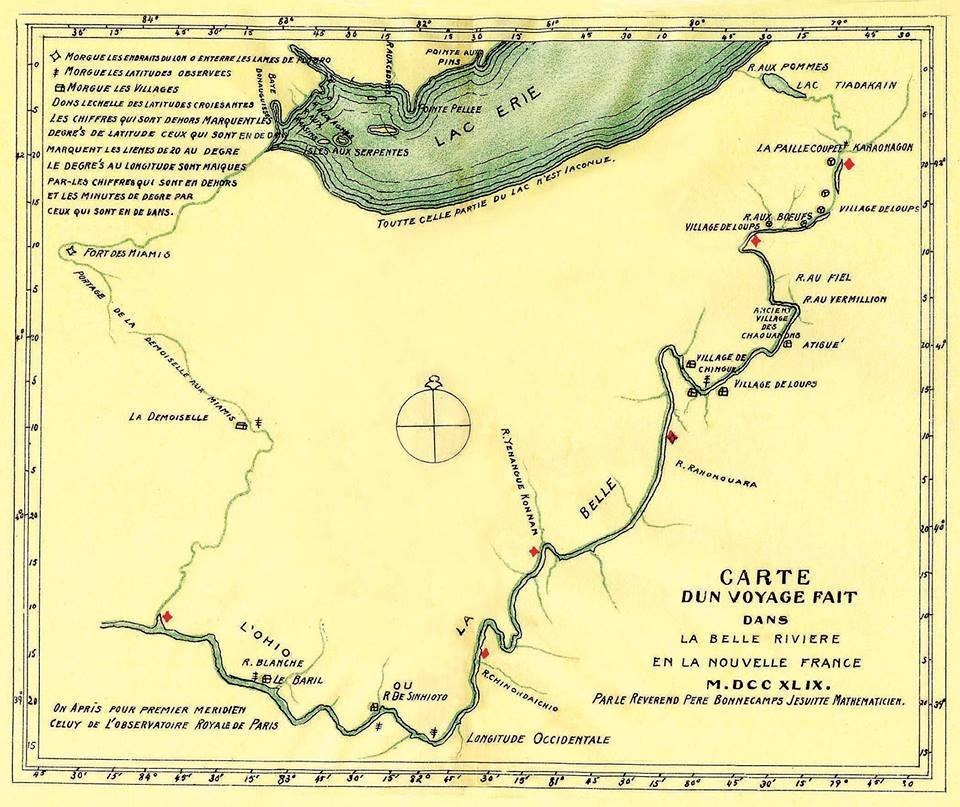
Map of the route followed by Pierre Joseph Céloron de Blainville along the Ohio River in 1749, drawn by Joseph Pierre de Bonnecamps, showing the "Village de Chingue" (Logstown)

In 1749, the Comte de La Galissonière wanted to strengthen French control over the Ohio Country, and in August he ordered the military commander at Detroit, Pierre Joseph Céloron de Blainville to travel down the Ohio River to demonstrate French dominance. Leading a force of eight officers, six cadets, an armorer, 20 soldiers, 180 Canadians, 30 Haudenosaunee and 25 Abenakis, Céloron moved down the river on a flotilla of 23 large boats and birch-bark canoes, on his "lead plate expedition," burying lead plates at six locations where major tributaries entered the Ohio and nailing copper plates bearing royal arms to trees to claim the territory for New France.

Céloron arrived at Logstown on August 8, 1749. The Shawnee chief Kakowatcheky, fearing an assault, rallied the town's population in its defense. According to William Trent, "the Indians ran to their arms and hoisted the English Colors. Cawcaw-wi-cha-ke, the Shawnese King about 114 years of age, set his back against the flag staff with his gun in his hand and desired the young men to kill them all." Céloron was enraged by the sight of the British flag, but noted the armed warriors, writing in his journal:

I made the men of my detachment brush themselves up as well as possible, so as to give them a better appearance, and I arranged everything...in good order, as I considered this one of the most considerable villages of the Beautiful River (the Ohio River)...When I was in sight of the village I discovered three French and one English flag...I had M. de Joncaire tell them to ...knock down the English [flag], or I would have it taken away myself. This was done immediately, a woman cut the pole and the flag has not been seen since...I fixed my camp securely near the village, and made it appear as strong as it was possible for me. I had body guards placed on the right and the left, I ordered sentinels to be placed at a short distance from each other, and bivouacked for the night.

The Jesuit priest Joseph Pierre de Bonnecamps, who accompanied Céloron, wrote about Logstown, which he called by its French name: "The village of Chiningué is quite new; it is hardly more than five or six years since it was established. The savages who live there are almost all Iroquois; they count about sixty warriors."

Céloron reported that he was informed that warriors in Logstown had planned to attack his camp during the first night, but that his well-armed force, sentinels, and carefully planned encampment discouraged them from doing so. Later that evening "the Chiefs, accompanied by thirty or forty braves, came to salute me." They apologized for the English flag, saying that it had been put on display by some young men "for show...and without perceiving the consequences," adding that "our heart is entirely French."

In contrast, William Trent recorded that as the warriors arrived, "every man discharged his gun loaded with ball & large shot into the ground between the Frenchmen's legs which almost blinded them & covered them with dirt. The Indians then came to the English traders [living in the town] and asked them if they should kill them, the English took pity on them, seeing Monsieur Céloron & his people much dejected & trembling with fear as they were sure of certain death should the traders advise them to it."

Céloron described Logstown and its inhabitants briefly:

This village consists of fifty cabins, composed of Iroquois, Channanous, Loups and a part of the men of the villages I had passed, who had come to seek refuge there, and to render them stronger...Besides these three nations there are in this village Iroquois from the Sault St. Louis (Kahnawake), from the Lake of Two Mountains (Mohawks of Kanesatake), and Indians from the Nepisiniques and the Abenakis, with Ontarios and other nations. This gathering forms a bad village, which is seduced by the allurements of cheap merchandise furnished by the English, which keeps them in very bad disposition towards us.

Céloron discovered some British traders living in Logstown. Incensed, he warned them to leave this territory which belonged to France. and wrote a scolding note to the governor of Pennsylvania, which stated in part:

I have been very much surprised to find some merchants of your government in this country, to which England has never had any pretensions. I have treated them with all possible mildness, though I had a right to look upon them as intruders and mere vagrants, their traffic being contrary to the preliminaries of the peace (Treaty of Aix-la-Chapelle (1748)), signed more than fifteen months ago. I hope, Sir, you will condescend to forbid this trade for the future, which is contrary to the treaties; and that you will warn your traders not to return into these territories; for, if so, they can only impute to themselves the evils which might befall them. I know that our Governor-General would be very sorry to have to resort to violent measures, but he has received positive orders not to allow foreign merchants or traders in his government.

During the night, Céloron was warned by Chabert de Joncaire that preparations were again being made in Logstown to attack the French camp, and he gave orders to his men to prepare for battle. He then sent Joncaire (who had lived in a Seneca village and spoke the language fluently) to advise the chiefs that the French were aware of their plans. Céloron writes that the warriors did not attack, but "filed before my camp and made the accustomed salute." Chiefs from the village visited the French camp the next day with pipes of peace, and Céloron reprimanded them for contemplating violence, adding: "I know how to make war, and those who have made war with us ought to know it, too."

The following day, 10 August 1749, Céloron delivered a prepared message from the Marquis de La Galissonière, the Governor of New France, which described how the English were deceiving the Ohio tribes and planning their "total ruin," adding: "I know the English only inspire you with evil sentiments, and, besides, intend, through their establishments on the Beautiful River, which belongs to me, to take it from me." The aged chief Kakowatcheky, listening in the audience, was apparently outraged. George Croghan, who arrived in Logstown a few days after Céloron had left, told Richard Peters that

Old Cackewatcheka was so exasperated at the Pride & Insolence of the French pretending to say that the Indian's land belonged to them that while he [Céloron] was in the midst of his Speech, the old King being blind and unable to stand without somebody to support him said in a low voice to those next to him, Why don't you shoot this French Fellow - Shoot him - shoot him.

Afterwards, Céloron called the English traders who were living in Logstown to meet with him, "to whom I addressed a summons to retire into their own territory with all their servants...They answered...that they would do so, that they knew well they had no right to trade on the Beautiful River." Bonnecamps wrote in his own diary:

The English there were 10 in number, and one among them was their chief. Monsieur de Céloron had him come, and ordered him, as he had done with the others, to return to his own country. The Englishman, who saw us ready to depart, acquiesced in all that was exacted from him, — firmly resolved, doubtless, to do nothing of the kind, as soon as our backs were turned.

Céloron then distributed gifts and departed from Logstown on 12 August, proceeding downriver to Lower Shawneetown. The expulsion of the British traders and Céloron's condescending attitude irritated the Shawnees, some of whom returned to their home villages, "tearing down and trampling underfoot with contempt" the French copper plates as they went."

Governor James Hamilton sent George Croghan to Logstown as soon as they learned of Céloron's visit, to find out how the Indians had reacted to the French expedition. Croghan arrived in late August, only a few days after Céloron's departure, and reported that the Indians had told Céloron "that the land was their own, and while there were any Indians in those parts they would continue to trade with the English," adding that “to separate them from their brothers, the English, would be like cutting a man in two halves and then expecting him to live.”

== Visit by Christopher Gist, 1750 ==
In September, 1750 the Ohio Company ordered Christopher Gist to survey lands along the Ohio to find an area of 200,000 acres that the Company could take possession of, according to a 1749 grant from King George II of England. Gist was instructed to

Search out and discover the Lands upon the River Ohio, & other adjoining Branches of the Mississippi down as low as the great Falls thereof: You are particularly to observe the Ways & Passes thro all the Mountains you cross, & take an exact Account of the Soil, Quality, & Product of the Land, and the Wideness and Deepness of the Rivers, & the several Falls belonging to them, together with the Courses & Bearings of the Rivers & Mountains as near as you conveniently can: You are, also to observe what Nations of Indians inhabit there, their Strength & Numbers, who they trade with, & in what Comodities they deal.

Gist arrived in Logstown on 25 November, describing the path of the Ohio River as it appeared before reaching the town: "Down the River...to Loggs Town, the Lands these last 8 [miles] very rich, the Bottoms above a Mile wide, but on the SE side, scarce a Mile wide, the Hills high and steep. In the Loggs Town, I found scarce any Body but a Parcel of reprobate Indian Traders, the Chiefs of the Indians being out a hunting." In the town he found the people suspicious of his reasons for being there, as it was already clear to the Natives that the colonial governments were hoping to take possession of the land: "The People in this Town, began to enquire my Business, and because I did not readily inform them, they began to suspect me, and said, I was come to settle the Indian's Lands and they knew I should never go Home again safe." Gist invented a reason for his visit, that "I had a Message to deliver the Indians from the King, by Order of the President of Virginia," which "obtained me Quiet and Respect among them." Gist spent one night in the town and left the next day, observing the river downstream from the town: "The Bottoms upon the River below the Logg's Town very rich but narrow, the high Land pretty good but not very rich."

== Visit by Chabert de Joncaire, 1750-51 ==
After Céloron returned and reported his experiences, the new Governor-General of New France, the Marquis de la Jonquière, decided to send Philippe-Thomas Chabert de Joncaire back to Logstown to establish a permanent French base there. In early July 1750, Joncaire set out from Montreal with a staff of eight cadets and four soldiers, in addition to two Cayuga guides. They traveled with two canoes loaded with goods, including powder and shot, intended as gifts for the Indians and for trade. They proceeded down the Allegheny to Logstown, where Joncaire had orders to establish a trading-house, two stories high, its walls fitted with crénelés, (loopholes) for defense. Joncaire was directed to explore the region, to learn all he could about the Monongahela River, to find a new route from southern Ohio to Lake Erie, to visit Lower Shawneetown and establish relations with the chiefs there, and finally, to report back to Céloron in Detroit.

Throughout September and October the Pennsylvania government received reports that a Frenchman named "Jean Coeur," or "John Ceur" was traveling up and down the Ohio River, distributing gifts and gaining influence with the Indians.

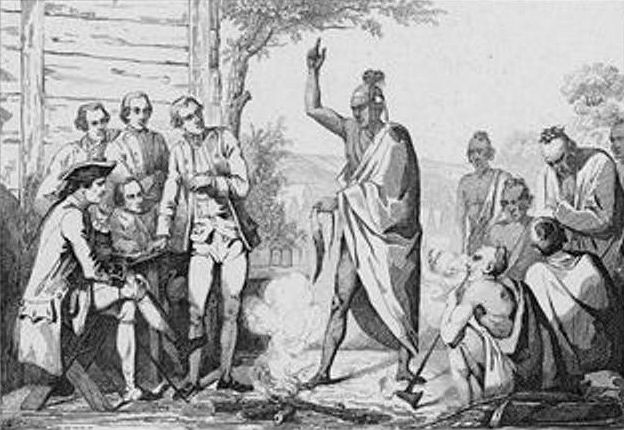
Conference between French and Native American leaders around 1750 by Émile Louis Vernier

Croghan returned to Logstown again in November, 1750, to tend to his trading post there. He wrote to Governor James Hamilton on 16 November: "Yesterday, Andrew Montour and I got to this Town, where we found thirty warriors of the Six Nations...They told us that they saw John Coeur [Joncaire] about one hundred and fifty miles up this River at an Indian Town, where he intends to build a Fort if he can get liberty from the Ohio Indians. He has five canoes loaded with goods, and is very generous in making presents to all the chiefs of the Indians that he meets with."

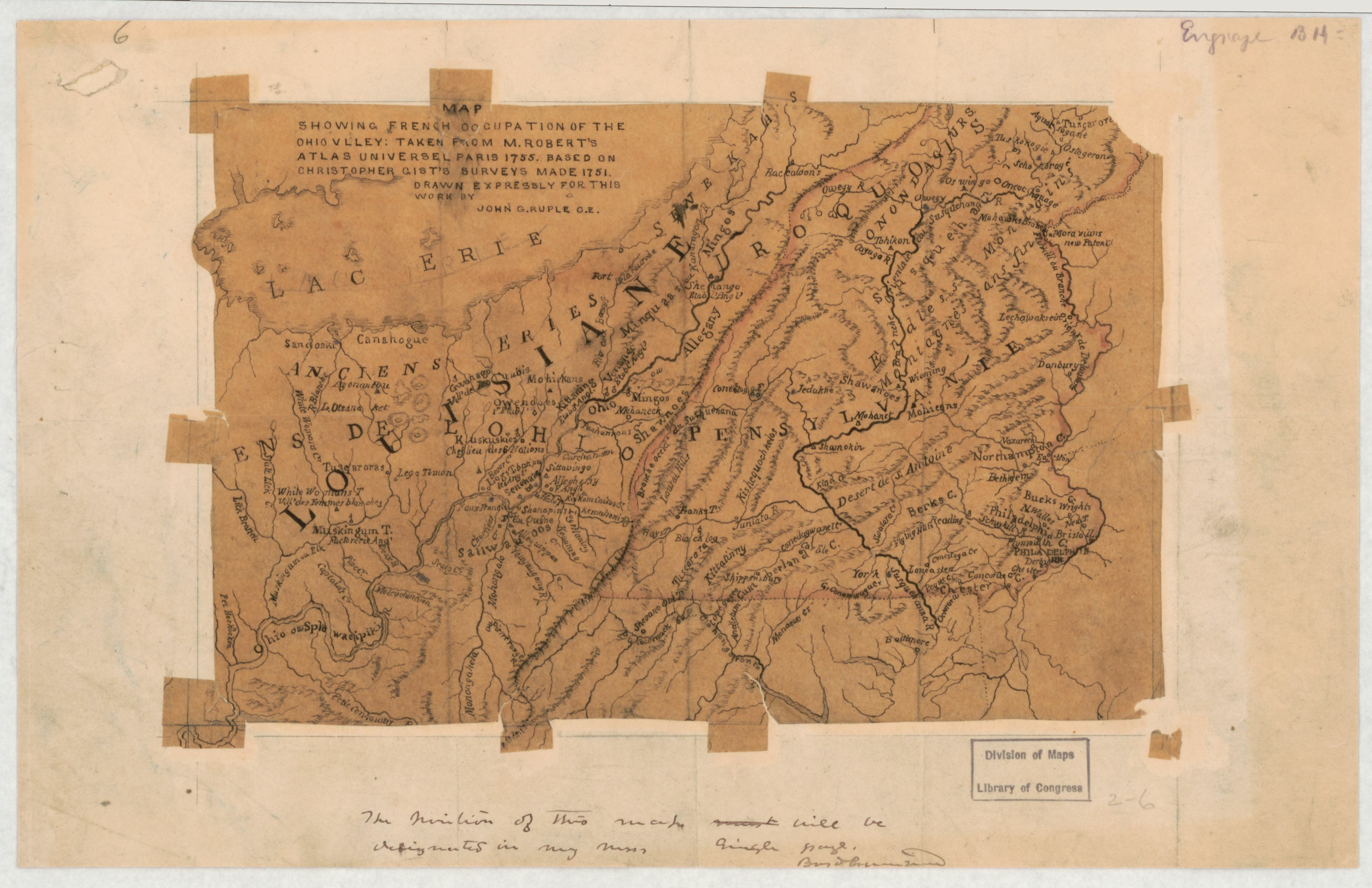
Map showing the French occupation of the Ohio Valley, based on Christopher Gist's surveys of 1751, showing "Logs T." to the lower left of center

Alarmed by these continued attempts of the French to maintain influence over the Ohio tribes, the Pennsylvania government purchased gifts and sent Croghan and Montour back to Logstown. They arrived on 18 May 1751, and were welcomed warmly. Two days after they arrived, "Mr. loncoeur and one Frenchman more" arrived, accompanied by forty Haudenosaunee warriors. On 21 May Joncaire called a council with the leaders of Logstown, and Croghan was also there. Joncaire requested that the leaders respond to Céloron's speech of August, 1749, challenging them to end all trade relations with the English. In his letter to Governor Hamilton, Croghan noted, "To enforce that speech he gave them a very large belt of wampum," a symbol of the importance of his message. Keeshequeatama, Speaker for the Six Nations, replied:

You desire we may turn our Brothers, the English, away, and not suffer them to come and trade with us again. I now tell you from our hearts, we will not; for we ourselves brought them here to trade with us and they shall live amongst us as long as there is one of us alive. You are always threatening our Brothers what you will do to them, and in particular, to that man (pointing to George Croghan); now, if you have anything to say to our Brothers, tell it to him if you be a man, as you Frenchmen always say you are, and the Head of all Nations. Our Brothers are the people we will trade with, and not you.

He then returned the belt of wampum, symbolically rejecting the French challenge to end trade with the English.

On 25 May Croghan met with Joncaire, who apologized for urging the leaders of Logstown to end trade with the English, saying that he was following orders from the Governor of Canada, but added that "he was sure the French could not accomplish their designs with the Six Nations, without it could be done by force; which, he said, he believed they [the French] would find to be as difficult as the method they had just tried, and would meet with the like success."

At another meeting with the town's leaders on 28 May, the Speaker of the Six Nations addressed Joncaire directly, saying, "Is it not our land (stamping on the ground, and putting his finger to Joncair's nose)? What right has Onontio (the Governor of New France) to our lands? I desire you may go home directly off our lands and tell Onontio to send us word immediately what was his reason for using our Brothers so, or what he means by such proceedings, that we may know what to do; for I can assure Onontio that we, the Six Nations, will not take such usage."

On 4 June 1751 Joncaire wrote directly to Governor Hamilton from Logstown, in French, with a warning:

Monsieur the Marquis de La Jonquiere, Governor of the whole of New France, having honored me with his orders to watch that the English should make no treaty in the country of the Ohio, I have directed the traders of your government to withdraw. You cannot be ignorant, sir, that all the lands of this region have always belonged to the King of France, and that the English have no right to come there to trade. My superior has commanded me to apprise you of what I have done, in order that you might not affect ignorance of the reasons of it, and he has given me this order with so much the greater reason because it is now two years since Monsieur Céloron, by order of Monsieur de La Galissoniere, then Commandant General, warned many English who were trading with the Indians along the Ohio, against doing so, and they promised him not to return to trade on the lands, as Monsieur Céloron wrote to you.

I have the honor to be, with great respect, Sir, Your very humble and obedient servant,
Joncaire
Lieutenant of a detachment of the Marine

Joncaire apparently abandoned the idea of constructing a blockhouse, and Governor Duquesne began preparations to send French and Canadian troupes de la marine to the south shore of Lake Erie, under the command of Paul Marin de la Malgue, to build a road and construct a series of forts (Fort Presque Isle, Fort Le Boeuf, Fort Machault), and later, Fort Duquesne.

== English attempts to build a fort at Logstown ==
The Ohio Haudenosaunee had been reluctant to allow the English to build forts in the region. As early as March 23, 1731, Seneca chiefs sent a message to Governor Patrick Gordon: "It is [our] land but your people may trade there but not build Stone or Timber houses, but of Bark." Twenty years later, the English began working to obtain permission to build forts.

George Croghan was in Logstown in November, 1750 when the residents mentioned to him that Joncaire was exploring the idea of building a French fort nearby. In his letter of 16 November to Governor Hamilton, Croghan then adds: "We have seen but very few of the Chiefs of the Indians they being all out a hunting, but those we have seen are of opinion that their Brothers the English ought to have a Fort on this River to secure the Trade." Governor Hamilton was evidently anxious to pursue this opportunity, and wanted Croghan to obtain approval from the Logstown sachems for the construction of an English fort, but told Croghan that no official request to build a fort should be made. Instead, Croghan was instructed to find out how the Indians felt about having an English stronghold on the Ohio.

On 29 May 1751, at a council meeting at Logstown between George Croghan, Andrew Montour and representatives of the Six Nations, Croghan reported the following statement from Haudenosaunee speaker Toanahiso:

We expect that you our Brothers will build a Strong House on the River Ohio, that if we should be obliged to engage in a war that we should have a Place to secure our Wives and Children...Now, Brothers, we will take two months to consider and choose out a place fit for that Purpose, and then we will send You word. We hope Brothers that as soon as you receive our Message you will order such a House to be built. Brothers: that you may consider well the necessity of building such a Place of Security to strengthen our arms, and that this, our first request of that kind may have a good effect on your minds.

Governor Hamilton used this statement as evidence to the Pennsylvania Provincial Council that they should pay for the construction of a fort at a site selected by the sachems at Logstown, arguing that unless the fort were built, the English might lose not only Indian support, but control over the fur trade in Ohio. But Andrew Montour contradicted Croghan's account, stating that the Indians had never requested a fort but had only agreed to consider the idea. Montour doubted that they would allow a fort to be built near Logstown. As a result, the Provincial Council decided not to provide funding for a fort, arguing that fair dealings and occasional presents would hold the Indians as allies. At the Treaty of Logstown in June 1752, Tanacharison agreed to the construction of a fort upriver from Logstown, but his figurehead authority as half-king did not allow him to speak for the Onondaga Council. The following summer, Virginia's Ohio Company obtained permission from the Six Nations to build Fort Prince George, but construction did not begin until February of 1754.

== Treaty of Logstown, 1752 ==
1751 map by Joshua Fry and Peter Jefferson depicting "Log's Town," at the upper margin

In 1749 the British Crown awarded the Ohio Company a grant of 500,000 acres in the Ohio Country between the Monongahela and the Kanawha Rivers, provided that the company would settle 100 families within seven years. The Ohio Company was also required to construct a fort and provide a garrison to protect the settlement at their own expense. The Treaty of Logstown was intended to open up land for settlement so that the Ohio Company could meet the seven-year deadline, and to obtain explicit permission to construct a fort.

Between 1 and 13 June 1752, the British held a council at Logstown with representatives of the Six Nations, and the Lenape and Shawnee who had been tributary to them. Colonel Joshua Fry, James Patton, and Lunsford Lomax represented the Colony of Virginia, and Christopher Gist, William Trent, and William Beverley represented the Ohio Company.

One of the main purposes of the Logstown treaty conference was to confirm the 1744 Lancaster Treaty in which the Six Nations supposedly gave up territory to Virginia, along the Ohio River on the southeast, as there was anxiety on the part of the colonial authorities as to whether the Indians were still willing to abide by the treaty. The Ohio Company and the Virginia commissioners also wanted the Ohio tribes to grant permission to build a fort at the forks of the Monongahela and Allegheny rivers and to allow new English settlements to be established on a half-million acres of unsettled land to the west and north of the Ohio River. The Company wanted to open trade with the Ohio Indians, which the French had forbidden. The Virginia and Pennsylvania delegates reminded the Delawares and Shawnees, "We advise and exhort you to beware of French Councils, and that you will adhere to a strict friendship with us (the English colonies and the Six Nations)."

At first, the Haudenosaunee sachem, Tanacharison (referred to in the treaty as "Thonariss, called by the English the half King"), reminded the Virginia officials that "the lands then sold [by the Six Nations at Lancaster in 1744] were to extend no further to the sunset [west] than the hill on the other [eastern] side of Allagany Hill," but he was eventually forced to cede Haudenosaunee lands beyond the Alleghenies, granting access to the territory the colonial authorities wanted. The Virginia representatives also tried to pretend that Indians would still have access to these lands, stating in the treaty: "Be assur'd that the King, our Father, by purchasing your Lands, had never any Intention of takeing them from you, but that we might live together as one People, & keep them from the French, who wou'd be bad Neighbours."

After much urging from Andrew Montour, Tanacharison reluctantly agreed to allow a British fort to be built at the mouth of the Monongahela River, the site of present-day Pittsburgh.

At the conclusion of the Logstown conference, Tanacharison promised that existing settlements southeast of the Ohio River "shall be unmolested by us, and that we will, as far as in our power, assist and Protect the British Subjects there." In spite of Tanacharison's promises, the Ohio Indians did not agree to allow English settlements in the Ohio region, and Scarouady, the Oneida half king to the Shawnees, warned, "we [the Ohio Indians] intend to keep our country clear of settlements." Tanacharison himself had regrets, and a year later he told the French "we live in a country in between [the French and the English colonies], therefore the land belongs to neither one nor t'other."

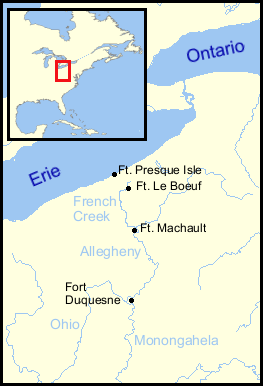
Forts built by the French in Western Pennsylvania in 1753

Technically, the treaty signed by the "Half-king" was not binding on the part of the Onondaga Council, although the colonial commissioners and the Ohio Company hoped that they would support the treaty, or at least agree to consider additional treaties in the coming months.

=== Appointment of Shingas as chief of the Lenape ===
Since the death of Sassoonan in 1747, the Lenape had been without an effective leader. Sassoonan had selected Pisquetomen as his successor, but James Logan saw him as an obstinate and independent obstructionist to Pennsylvania's political agenda. Logan also wanted a leader with the determination to bring those Lenape who had migrated to Ohio back to the Susquehanna region, and felt that Pisquetomen would be unable and unwilling to attempt this. Logan and Weiser actively tried to promote Lappapitton as Sassoonan's successor, but Lappapitton declined out of respect for Pisquetomen. The Haudenosaunee instructed Tanacharison to decide on a leader acceptable to all parties, and at Logstown Tanacharison presented Shingas as his choice, arguing "that is our right to give you a King" to represent the Lenape in "all publick Business" between the Lenape, the Six Nations, and the British. Tanacharison announced to the Virginia commissioners, "we have given our Cousins, the Delawars, a King, who lives there, we desire you will look upon him as a Chief of that Nation." Shingas was absent from the treaty conference, so Tamaqua "stood proxy for his brother and was presented with a lace hat and jacket and suit."

=== French response to the treaty ===
The French wanted to maintain control of the Ohio Valley because it lay between their two great provinces of Canada and La Louisiane, and English control of the region would make French commerce, defense and communication slower, more expensive, and less secure. They responded to the news of the treaty by sending troops to construct and garrison a series of forts, intended to solidify their military presence in the Ohio region, intimidate the Native American inhabitants, and keep the British out. Francois Bigot, intendant of New France since 1748, wrote this summary of the French plan on 26 October 1752:

It is necessary to send 2000 Frenchmen with 200 of our domiciliated savages to this river (the Ohio)...in the spring; to build a store house at the lower end of this portage on the shore of Lake Erie, and another at the end of this same portage on Lake Chatakouin; likewise, to make a fort at La Paille Coupée (Brokenstraw Creek, later the site of Fort Le Boeuf) where M. de Joncaire is located, another at the Written Rock (McKees Rocks, Pennsylvania, below Pittsburgh) or at Chiningué (Logstown), and a third at Sonhioto (the Scioto River, site of Lower Shawneetown). The garrisons of these forts will be taken from the 2000 men.

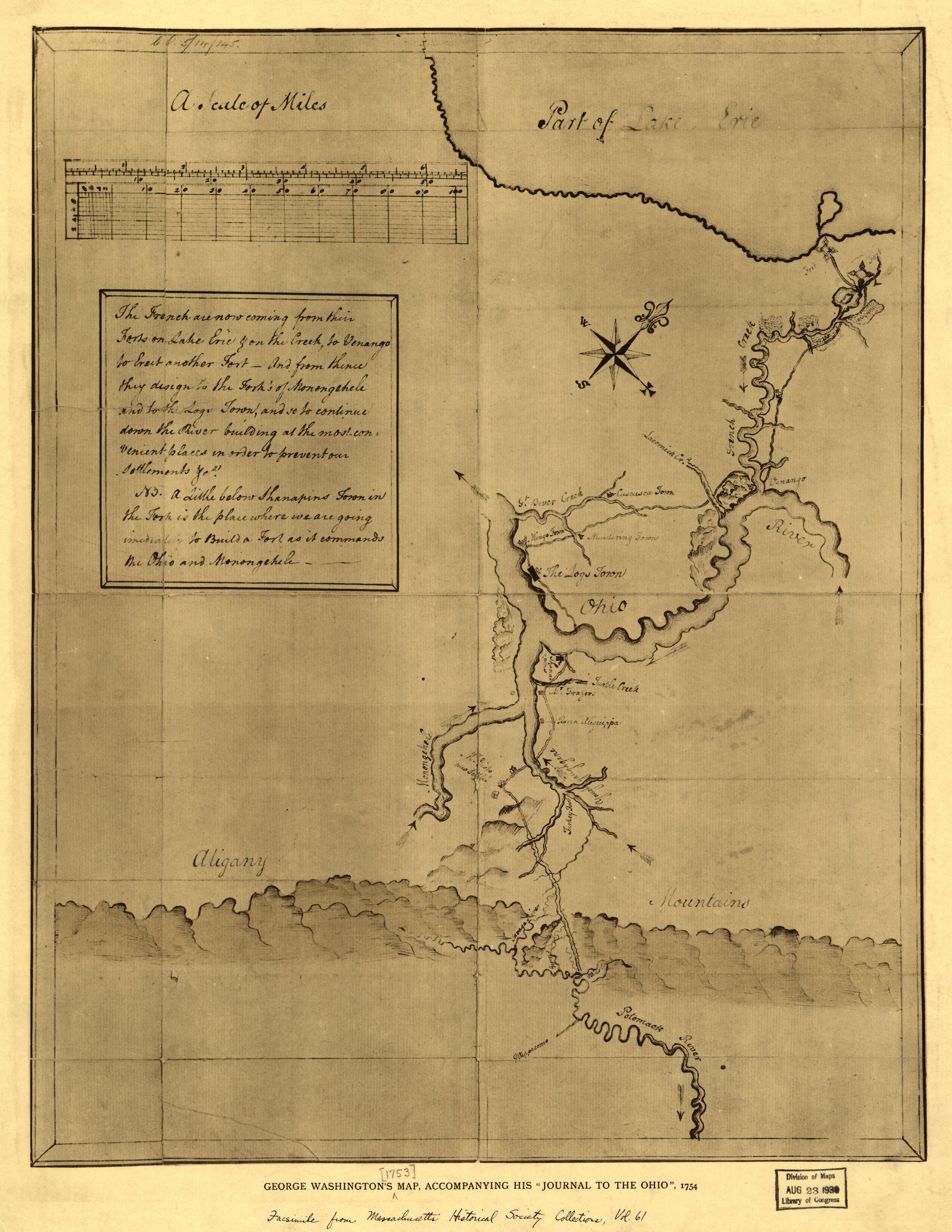
George Washington's 1754 map of the confluence of the Ohio and the Monongahela rivers, showing "The Log's Town."

In late 1753 (the exact date is unknown) the sachems at Logstown received a letter from Jacques Legardeur de Saint-Pierre stating:

I am commanded to build four strong Houses, viz. at Weningo, Mohongialo Forks, Logs-Town, and Beaver Creek, and this I will do...All the Land and Waters on this Side Allegheny Hills are mine, on the other Side theirs; this is agreed on between the two Crowns over the great Waters. I do not like your selling your Lands to the English; they shall draw you into no more foolish Bargains. I will take Care of your Lands for you, and of you.

== Visit by George Washington, 1753 ==
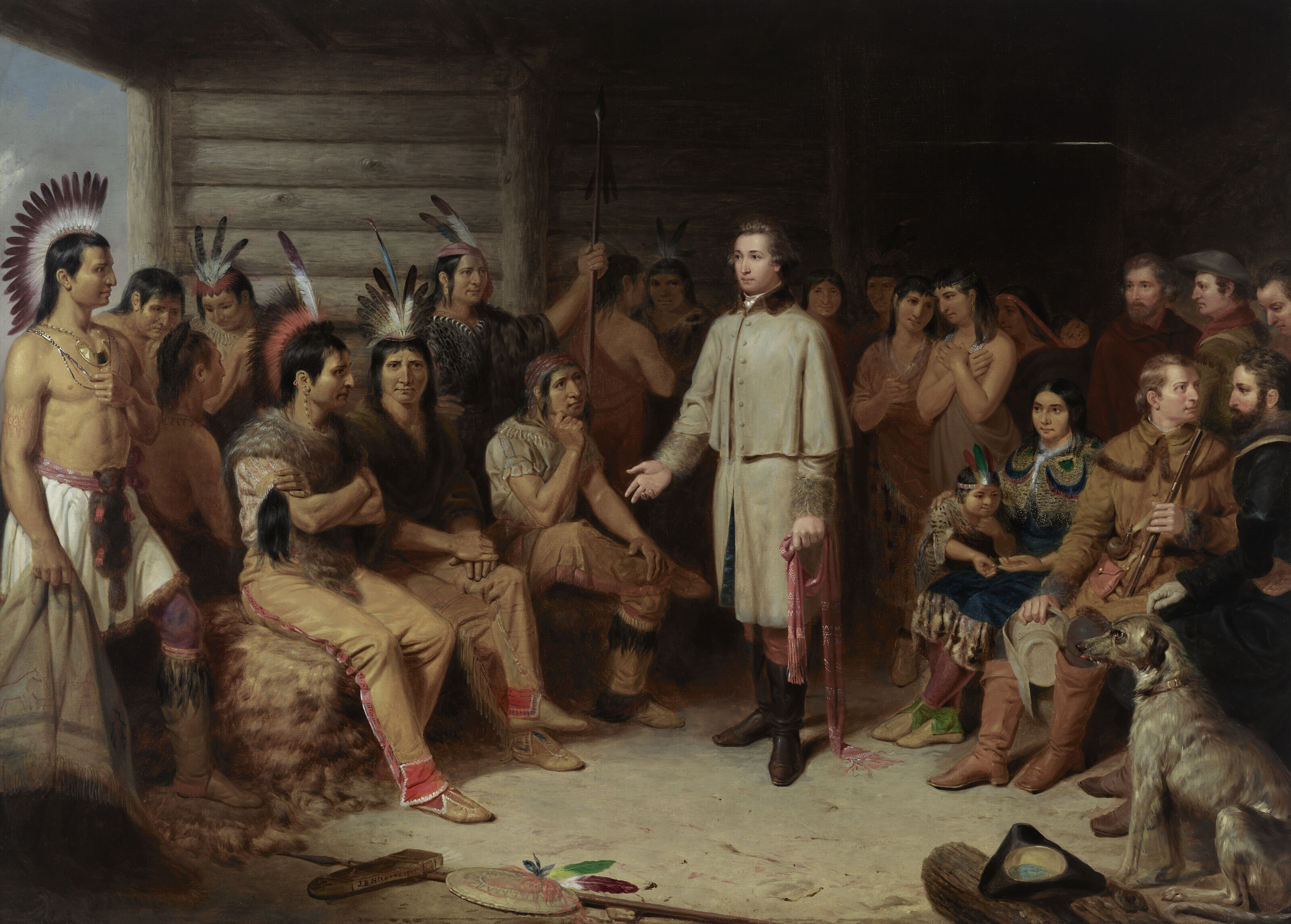
"Washington in the Indian Council," by Junius Brutus Stearns (1847), depicting Washington (standing) and Gist meeting with Shingas, Scarouady, Tanacharison, and other Native American leaders at Logstown in November, 1753

In late 1753, Virginia Governor Dinwiddie appointed newly-commissioned Major George Washington as a special envoy to the French commander at Fort Le Boeuf to demand that the French vacate the Ohio Valley territory, which the British had claimed. Washington was also ordered to make peace with the Haudenosaunee Confederacy and to gather intelligence about the French forces.

Washington left Williamsburg, Virginia on 30 October with eight men, heading to Logstown to meet with Haudenosaunee allies. On his way, he stopped at the homestead of Christopher Gist near Wills Creek and Gist joined them.

Arriving in Logstown on 23 November, Washington held council with Shingas, Scarouady, and Tanacharison, who had recently returned from a journey to Fort Le Boeuf himself. The chiefs provided Washington with information about the best route to Fort Le Boeuf, and called a council of sachems. Washington explained his mission, and received assurances that the Indians and the English "were brothers." Tanacharison told Washington that "he cou’d not consent to our going without a Guard, for fear some Accident shou’d befall us," and volunteered to accompany Washington, along with Kaghswaghtaniunt (White Thunder), Guyasuta, and Jeskakake, on his journey to Fort Le Boeuf. Their purpose was to return three belts of wampum sent by the French as a symbol of friendship. Returning the wampum was a gesture intended to show that the sachems at Logstown were allied with the English. Washington wrote in his diary that "I knew that returning of Wampum was the abolishing of Agreements; & giving this up was shaking of all Dependence upon the French."

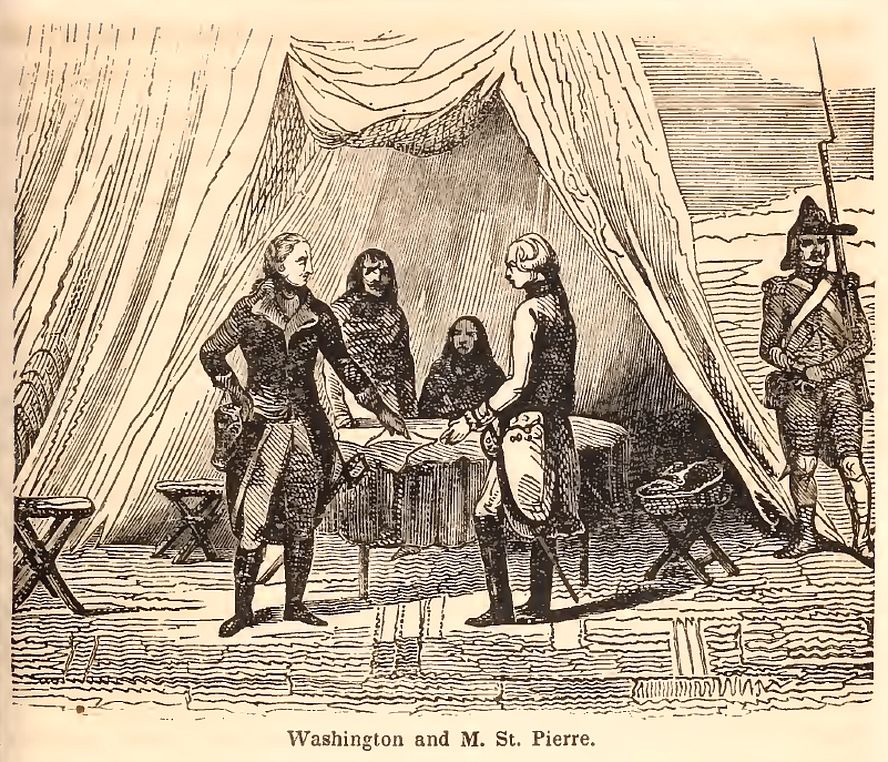
George Washington (left) meeting with French military commander Jacques Legardeur de Saint-Pierre at Fort Le Boeuf in 1753. In the background are Tanacharison and another Indian from Logstown, possibly Guyasuta.

While at Logstown, Washington encountered four French deserters who had fled from a French military supply convoy from Fort de Chartres in Illinois, under the command of Captain Demazilière and headed towards Lake Erie, where a French military force under the command of Paul Marin de la Malgue was building a road between Fort Presque Isle, Fort Le Boeuf, and Fort Machault. The deserters had learned of La Malgue's sudden death on 29 October and had taken refuge in Lower Shawneetown. They were on their way to Philadelphia in the company of an English trader.

Washington and his men left Logstown on 30 November and reached Venango at French Creek on 4 December, where they were warmly greeted by Philippe-Thomas Chabert de Joncaire, who was in command of the French troops at Venango. Joncaire provided Washington's men with wine and brandy, and the Indians, when intoxicated, declared their loyalty to the French. It took Washington three days to persuade them to move on to Fort Le Boeuf, where they met the French commander Jacques Legardeur de Saint-Pierre. Tanacharison tried to return the wampum to Saint-Pierre, "who evaded taking it, & made many fair Promises of Love & Friendship; said he wanted to live in Peace & trade amicably with them; as a Proof of which, he wou’d send some Goods immediately down to the Logstown for them." The French refused to consider leaving the area, and gave Washington a reply to deliver personally to Williamsburg.

== French attempts to build a fort at Logstown ==
After Washington's return to Williamsburg, Governor Dinwiddie wrote to Governor James De Lancey of New York about Washington's mission, stating:

"On his arrival he found that the French had taken a post on a branch of the River Ohio, and built a Fort...and that they had in readiness materials for other forts, which they declared their intentions to erect on the River, and particularly at Logstown, the place destined for their chief residence, as soon as the season would permit them to embark."

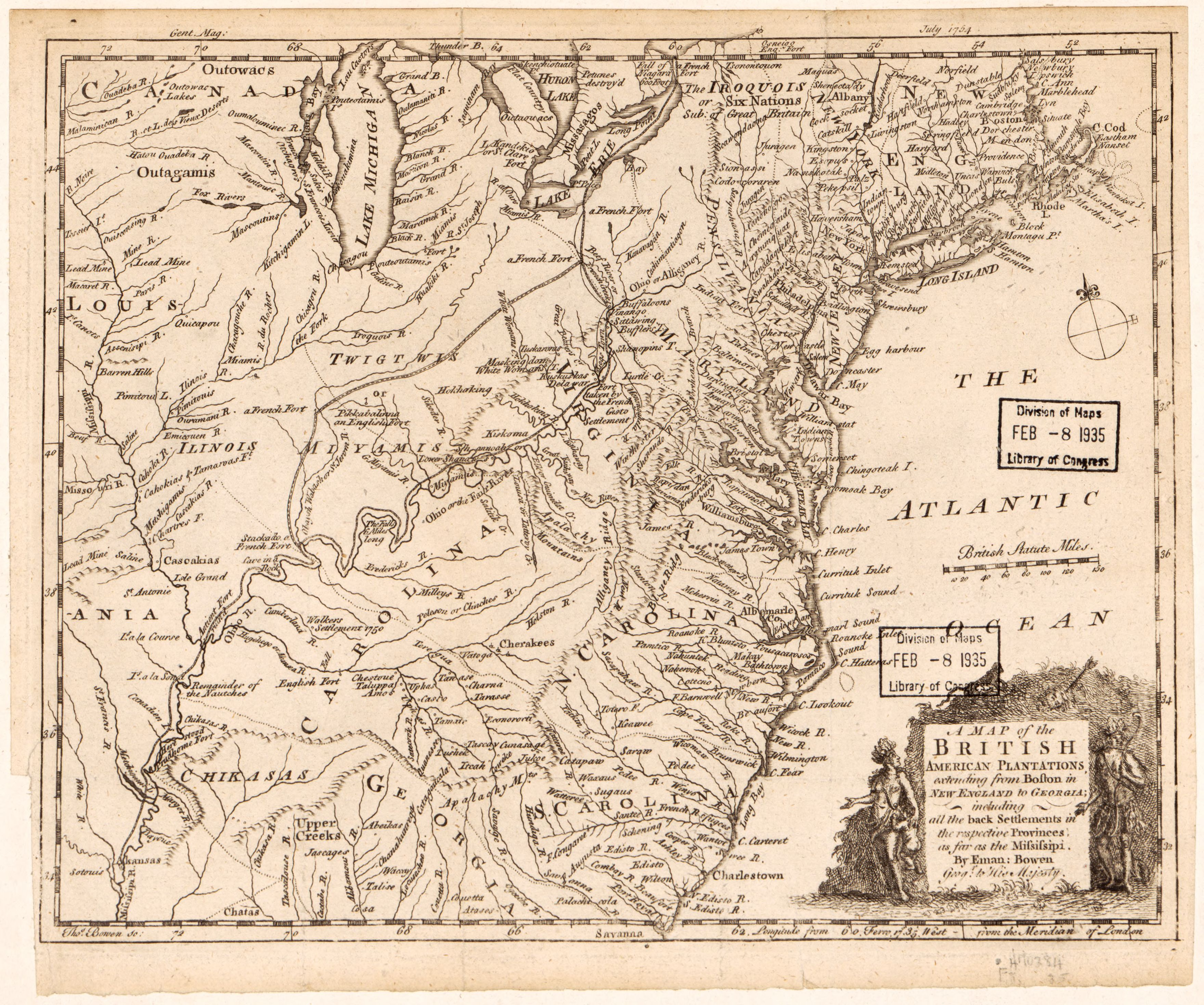
1754 map of British plantations in North America, showing "Loggs Town" on the Ohio

Tanacharison returned to Logstown on 15 January 1754, escorted by a French detachment under Ensign Michel Maray de La Chauvignerie which set up a temporary post nearby. George Croghan had arrived in Logstown the day before, accompanied by the trader John Patten, and observed the arrival of the French troops, "an Ensign, a Sergeant, and Fifteen Soldiers." The next day, as Patten was walking around the town, the French commandant ordered him to be arrested. Tanacharison and Croghan protested vigorously, and Croghan noted that the residents of Logstown seemed very opposed to the presence of French soldiers in the town. The French decided to "board their Canoes and set off to a small Town of the Six Nations about two Miles below the Log's Town, where [La Chauvignerie] intends to stay till the Rest of their Army come down." Correspondence between La Chauvignerie and his superior at Fort Le Boeuf, Saint-Pierre, describe the French soldiers as suffering from hunger and cold, as firewood was difficult to find. La Chauvignerie writes on February 10: "We are on the eve of being without food...The scarcity of wood which prevails in this place causes us all to be exposed to the harshness of the weather...I shall take every care to keep the tribes as peaceful as possible until a reinforcement arrives."

Saint-Pierre was evidently planning to construct a fort near Logstown and to drive away any English settlers. Governor Duquesne wrote orders to Captain Michel Péan:

1755 map by John Mitchell showing "Logs T. built & settled by the English several years agoe," upper left of map's center

"When Sieur Péan arrives at Chiningué, if Sieur de Contrecœur thinks it advisable, he will put his troops to work strengthening the establishment of the fort and, if necessary, enlarging it, in order to take care of as many as two hundred men in garrison for an entire year...When this fort is entirely finished or in the final stages of completion by its garrison, Sieur Péan...will continue...to the Rivière à la Roche. In case he found on his way some English establishments not farther than six leagues from the river, he would call on them to retire, would give the plunder to the savages and destroy these settlements."

The French fort at Logstown was to be built by Contrecœur, whose original orders had been to proceed down the Allegheny and Ohio and establish a military base there. The French had been planning to build a fort at Logstown since 1752, and had sent a sizeable French force to the south shore of Lake Erie to build roads and clear the rivers of rocks and driftwood so that boats could bring supplies. Problems with supplies and illness among the troops had slowed progress, however, and the sudden death of Marin, the commander, at Fort Le Boeuf on 29 October forced the French to postpone the project. In January 1754, Governor Duquesne ordered Contrecœur to take 600 men and advance to Logstown, to start construction.

Then on 4 March 1754, La Chauvignerie discovered English soldiers building Fort Prince George at the confluence of the Ohio and the Monongahela rivers. Contrecœur seized it on 18 April 1754, and razed it to build Fort Duquesne. The French then decided that a fort at Logstown was unnecessary, particularly because of the lack of trees for lumber.

== Destruction of Logstown, 1754 ==
A few days before Washington's surrender at Fort Necessity on 3 July 1754, Scarouady burned down Logstown. Washington's journal entry for 26 June 1754, reads: "An Indian arrived bearing the news that Monacatoocha (Scarouady) had burned his village, Logstown, and was gone by water with his people to Red-Stone, and might be expected there in two days." Henry Wilson Temple reports that the town's inhabitants destroyed it "fearing lest they might be punished for their alliance with the French." About 200 of the town's Haudenosaunee, Shawnee and Lenape residents moved to Fort Cumberland, and later to the Aughwick Valley near present-day Shirleysburg, Pennsylvania.

== Later years ==
=== Rebuilding, 1755 ===
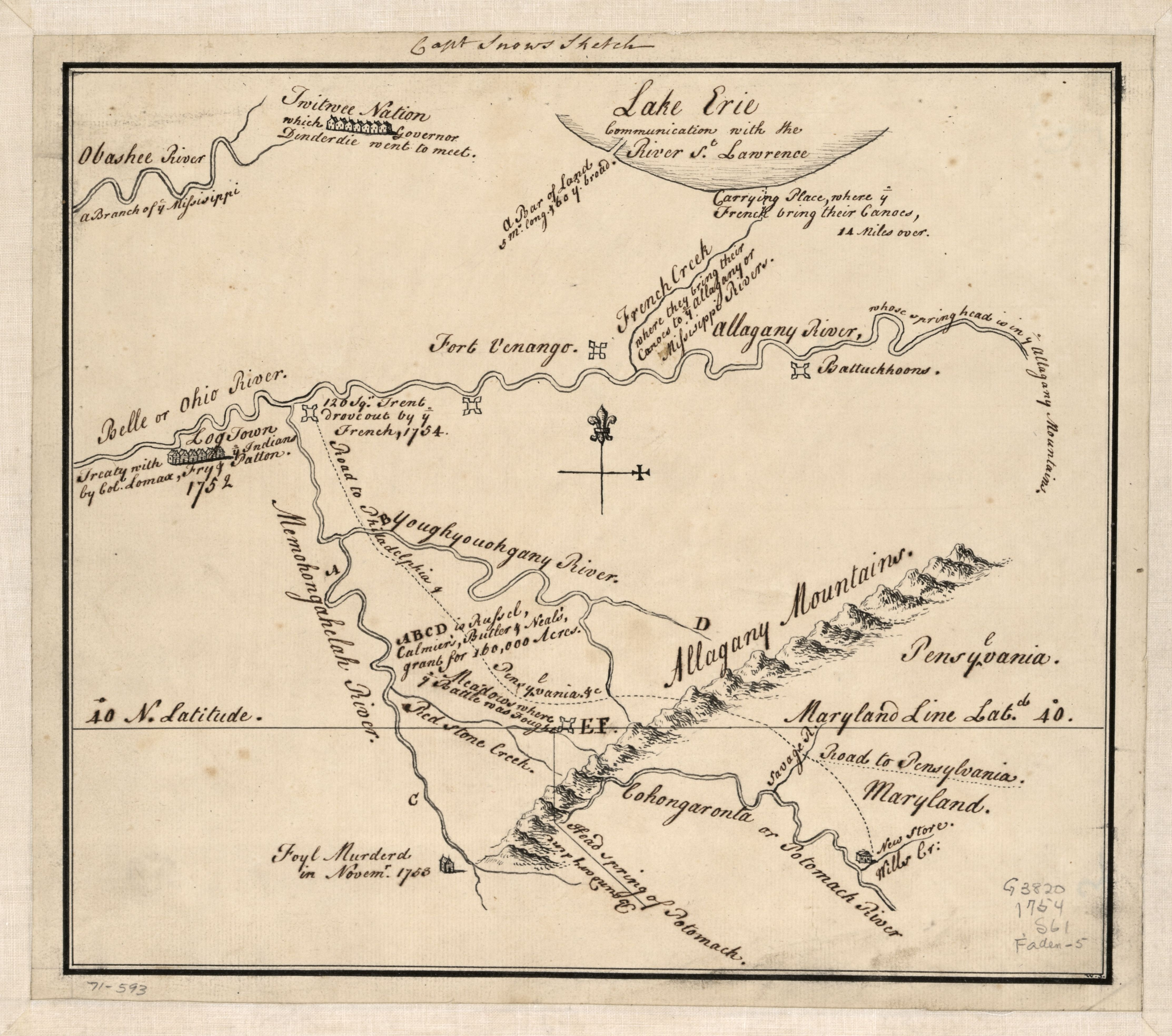
Captain Snow's undated map of western Pennsylvania, showing "Logtown, treaty with ye Indians by Col. Lomax, Fry & Patton 1752." Logstown is depicted as a row of French-built cabins.

In March, 1755, French forces began rebuilding the village. Joseph Gaspard Chaussegros de Lery passed the site of the town on 5 April 1755 and refers to it as the "Little Chaouanon Village." Progress was initially slow. Charles Stuart, who was taken captive by a group of Lenape and Shawnee warriors during the Great Cove massacre in November 1755, was taken to Logstown in December and reported: "When we came to Loggs town we found all the Cabbins waste but Three."

In December, 1755, George Croghan hired a Lenape Indian named Jo Hickman to visit Kittanning and Logstown and bring back information on the number of warriors and European prisoners in each place, as Indian raids on settlements had become frequent, and the Pennsylvania Provincial Council was contemplating sending a military force to attack one or both of these communities. At Logstown Hickman observed "about 100 Indians and 30 English prisoners."

Christian Frederick Post visited the town in December, 1758, and wrote in his journal: "I came to Logs Town, situated on a hill. On the east end is a great piece of low land, where the Old Log's Town used to stand. In the New Log's Town, the French have built about thirty houses for the Indians."

John McCullough was 8 years old when he was captured by Lenape warriors in July, 1756, and brought to "Shenango," (a corruption of Chiningué). In his captivity narrative he reports living there with a Lenape family for two and a half years and states that Logstown "lay in a semi-circular form, round the bend of a creek." He refers to an upper town and a lower town. In late 1758, he moved to "Kseek-he-ooing" (possibly Saucunk) and was released in December, 1764, along with over 200 other captives, by order of Colonel Henry Bouquet.

=== Abandonment, 1758 ===
In late 1758, Logtown's inhabitants were invited to establish a new town on the Upper Scioto, at Pickaway Plains, by the former residents of Lower Shawneetown, who had abandoned their village in November 1758. On 26 November, George Croghan and Andrew Montour proceeded down the river to Shingas's Town (Saucunk). In his journal, Croghan writes:

Set off at seven o'clock, in company with six Delawares, and that night arrived at Logs Town, which we found deserted by its late inhabitants. On inquiring the reason of their speedy flight, the Delawares informed me the Lower Shanoes [inhabitants of Lower Shawneetown] had removed off the River up Sihotta (Scioto), to a great plain called Moguck, and sent for those that lived here to come there and live with them, and quit the French, and at the same time the deputies of the Six Nations, which I had sent from Easton, came and hastened their departure. In this Town [Logstown] is forty houses, all built for them by the French, and lived here about one hundred and twenty warriors.

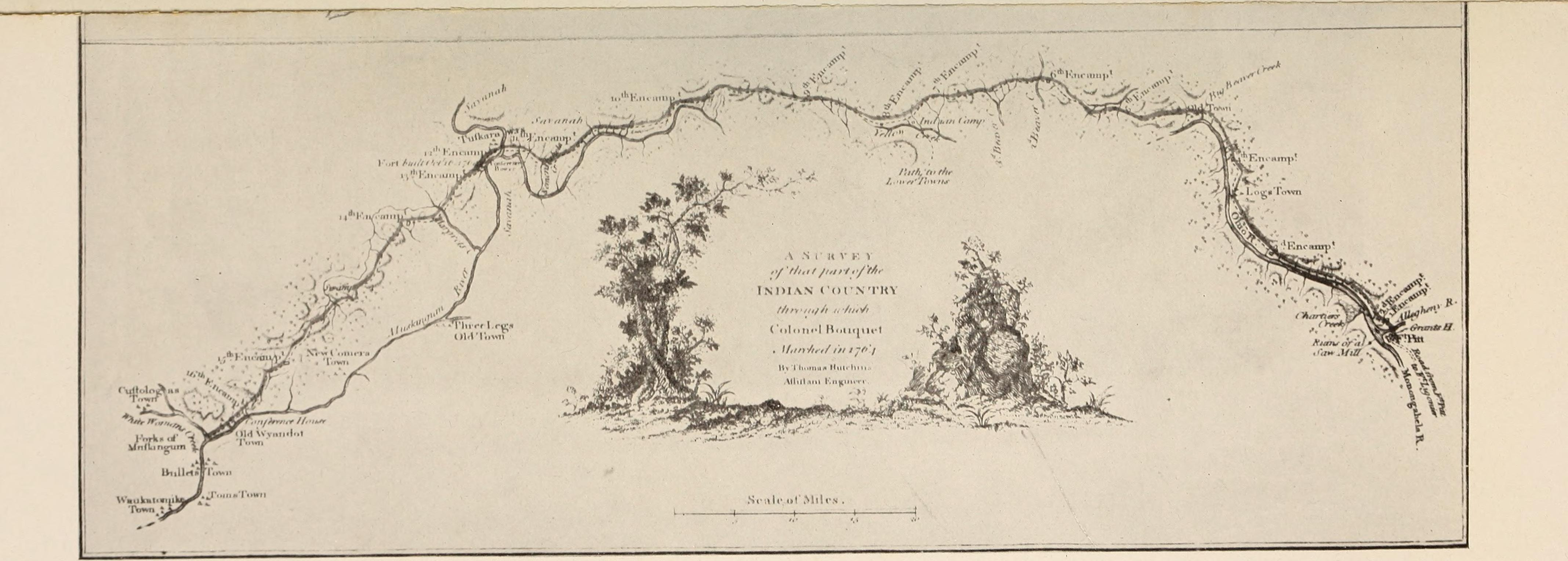
1764 map by Thomas Hutchins of Henry Bouquet's expedition showing "Logs Town" on the Ohio, seen on the right side of the page

Henry Bouquet passed through the area in 1764, en route with 1,500 troops to Ohio, writing in his journal:

Friday, October 5. In this day's march, the Army passed through Loggstown, situated seventeen miles and an half, fifty-seven perches by the path from Fort Pitt. This place was noted before the last war for the great trade carried on there by the English and French, but its inhabitants abandoned it in the year 1758. The lower town extended about sixty perches over a rich bottom to the foot of a low, steep ridge, on the summit of which, near the declivity, stood the upper town, commanding a most agreeable prospect over the lower and quite across the Ohio, which is quite five hundred yards wide here, and by its majestic, easy current adds much to the beauty of the place.

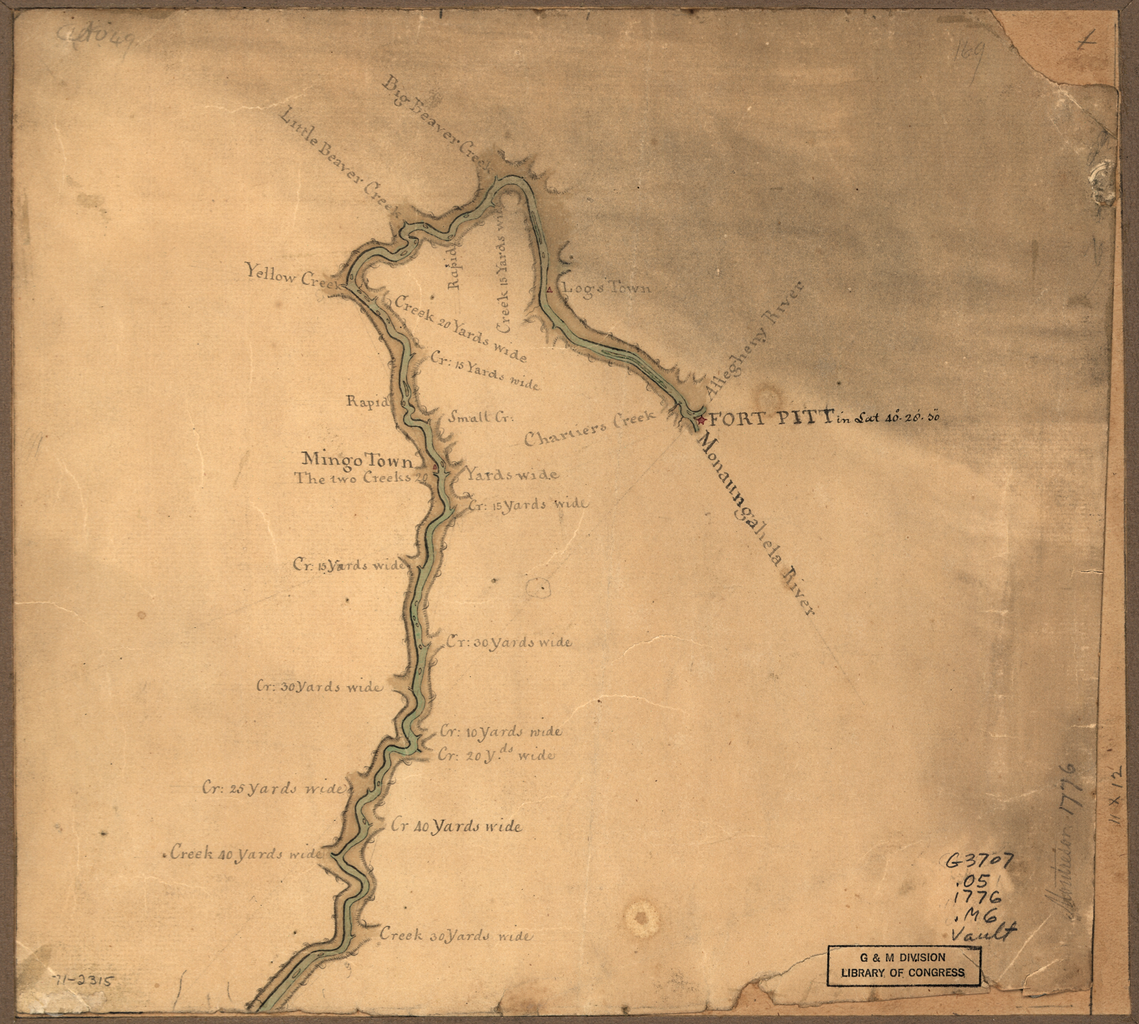
1776 map by John Montrésor showing Logs Town near Fort Pitt

George Croghan returned to the area in 1765. His journal entry for 16 May says:

We set off at seven o'clock in the morning, and at ten o'clock arrived at the Logs Town, an old settlement of the Shawnesse, about seventeen miles from Fort Pitt, where we put ashore, and viewed the remains of that village, which was situated on a high bank, on the south side of the Ohio river, a fine fertile country round it.

George Washington returned to the area and noted in his journal that on 21 October 1770 he "breakfasted at Logstown" with George Croghan and Alexander McKee, but says nothing of the community or its inhabitants. On 5 September 1772, the Reverend David McClure visited John Gibson, a trader, at "his house in Logs Town, which was the only house there."

Arthur Lee, an Indian Commissioner, visited Fort McIntosh in 1784. His journal entry for December 17 begins: "We embarked on the Monongahela, and soon entered the Ohio...Four miles down the River brings you to Montour's Island...The next place is Loggstown, which was formerly a settlement on both sides of the Ohio, and the place where the Treaty of Lancaster was confirmed by the Western Indians."

=== Legionville, 1792 ===
In 1792, General Anthony Wayne established a military training base for the newly formed Legion of the United States on ground situated where Logstown's "upper town" had been. Legionville became the first basic training camp for regular Army recruits, and was the first facility established expressly for this purpose. In March, 1793 the Seneca leader Guyasuta, a former resident of Logstown, was invited to Legionville to meet with General Wayne for peace talks. The site was vacated in 1793 after the troops left to fight in the Northwest Indian War.

== Archaeological excavations ==
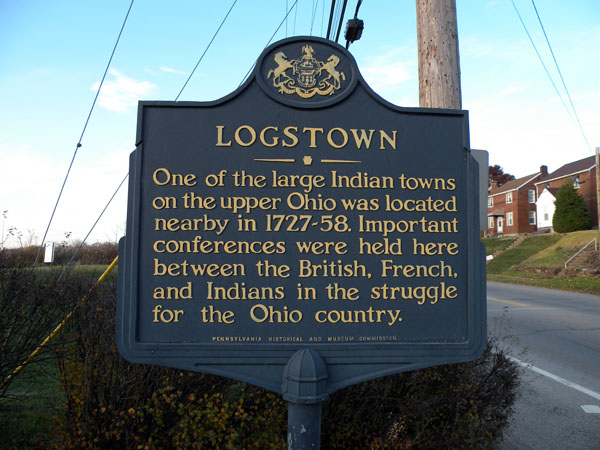
Historical marker at the former site of Logstown, near present-day Ambridge in Beaver County, Pennsylvania

The only known archaeological studies of the Logstown site took place in 1940 and 1942. The 1955 Annals of the Carnegie Museum states: "One unsuccessful attempt has been made [in 1942] to locate the late Historic village known as Logstown."

In 2011 an archaeological survey of the Beaver Creek area noted that the Logstown site has never been

...formally excavated by professional archaeologists. Advancement of the Colonial period...had a devastating effect on the archaeological record of the last organized native villages of the western part of the state. Further destruction occurred as industry and development expanded, and any remains that survived the initial onslaught [were] likely wiped away.

In 2019 the National Park Service conducted a survey of the route traveled by George Washington from Williamsburg, Virginia to Fort LeBoeuf between October, 1753 and January, 1754, to determine the feasibility of designating this a National Historic Trail. The report notes that "The site of Logs Town, an Indian village that Washington visited in 1753, also has...potential for an archeological survey."

== See also ==
- Legionville
- Lower Shawneetown
- History of Pennsylvania
- French and Indian War
- History of Pittsburgh
- Meshemethequater
- Opessa Straight Tail
- Kakowatcheky
