= Scarouady =

Scarouady (/ˈskærəˌwɒdi/, fl. 1747–1755; also spelled Scarowady, Scarrouady, Scaroyady, Scarujade, Scaiohady, Skaronyade, Scaronage, Scruniyatha, Seruniyattha, or Skaruntia) was an Oneida leader at Logstown. He was sometimes referred to as Monacatuatha (/ˌmoʊnəkəˈtuːəθə/ also rendered Monacatootha, Monacatoocha, or Monakaduto) by the Lenape.

Scarouady was half-king, along with Tanacharison, over Haudenosaunee and Haudenosaunee allies in the Ohio Valley. They both disliked the encroachment of the French into the area, and in 1747 both were sent to Logstown to act as supervisors of the Haudenosaunee allies, the Lenape (Tanacharison) and the Shawnee (Scarouady). In 1753 Scarouady met with officials of Pennsylvania and Virginia to convince them to take action against the French. The situation was so bad that in June, 1754 Scarouady burned his village of Logstown and moved to Aughwick to escape the French. He was a member of the Braddock expedition in 1754.

Scarouady was an orator and worked with the aid of William Johnson to keep the Shawnee and the Lenape on the side of the British in the French and Indian War.

The borough of Monaca, Pennsylvania, was named in honor of Monacatootha.
