= Tanacharison =

Seneca chief (1700–1754)

Seneca tribe leader

Personal details
- Born: c. 1700 Near Buffalo, New York
- Died: October 7, 1754 Paxtang, Pennsylvania
- Cause of death: Pneumonia
- Known for: Starting the French and Indian War
- Nickname: Half-King

Tanacharison (/ˌtænəxəˈrɪsən/; c. 1700 – 4 October 1754), also called Tanaghrisson (/ˌtænəˈɡrɪsən, ˌtænəxˈrɪsən/), was a Native American leader who played a pivotal role in the beginning of the French and Indian War. He was known to European-Americans as the "Half-King", a title also used to describe several other historically important Native American leaders. His name has been spelled in a variety of ways. (Note: Including Tenachrisan, Deanaghrison, Tanahisson, Thanayieson, Tannghrishon, Tanareeço, Thonariso, Thonariss, and Johonerissa.)

== Early life ==
Little is known of Tanacharison's early life. Anderson says he was born into the Catawba tribe whose lands and villages were along what is now called the Catawba River in South Carolina.

== Becoming a leader ==
Tanacharison first appears in historical records in 1747, living in Logstown (near present Ambridge, Pennsylvania), a multi-ethnic village about 20 miles (30 kilometers) downstream from the Forks of the Ohio. Those Haudenosaunee who had migrated to the Ohio Country were generally known as "Mingos", and Tanacharison emerged as a Mingo leader at this time. He also represented the Six Nations at the 1752 Treaty of Logstown, where he was referred to as "Thonariss, called by the English the half King". At this treaty, he spoke on behalf of the Six Nations' Grand Council, but also made clear that the council's ratification was required, in accordance with the Haudenosaunee system of government.

According to the traditional interpretation, the Grand Council had named Tanacharison as leader or "half-king" (a sort of viceroy) to conduct diplomacy with other tribes, and to act as spokesman to the British on their behalf. However, some modern historians have doubted this interpretation, asserting that Tanacharison was merely a village leader, whose actual authority extended no further than his own village. In this view, the title "half king" was probably a British invention, and his "subsequent lofty historical role as a Six Nations 'regent' or 'viceroy' in the Ohio Country was the product of later generations of scholars."

== French and Indian War ==
In 1753, the French began the military occupation of the Ohio Country, driving out British traders and constructing a series of forts. British colonies, however, also claimed the Ohio Country. Robert Dinwiddie, the lieutenant governor of Virginia, sent a young George Washington to travel to the French outposts and demand that the French vacate the Ohio Country. On his journey, Washington's party stopped at Logstown to ask Tanacharison to accompany them as a guide and as a "spokesman" for the Ohio Indians. Tanacharison agreed to return the symbolic wampum he had received from French captain Philippe-Thomas Chabert de Joncaire. Joncaire's first reaction, on learning of this double cross, was to mutter of Tanacharison, "He is more English than the English." But Joncaire masked his anger and insisted that Tanacharison join him in a series of toasts. By the time the keg was empty, Tanacharison was too drunk to hand back the wampum.

Tanacharison traveled with Washington to meet with Jacques Legardeur de Saint-Pierre, the French commander of Fort Le Boeuf in what is now Waterford, Pennsylvania. There he tried to return the wampum to Saint-Pierre, "who evaded taking it, & made many fair Promises of Love & Friendship; said he wanted to live in Peace & trade amicably with them; as a Proof of which, he wou’d send some Goods immediately down to the Logstown for them." The French refused to vacate, however, and to Washington's great consternation, they tried to court Tanacharison as an ally. Although fond of their brandy, he remained a strong francophobe.

Tanacharison had requested that the British construct a "strong house" at the Forks of the Ohio, and early in 1754 he placed the first log of an Ohio Company stockade there, railing against the French when they captured it. He was camped at Half King's Rock on May 27, 1754 when he learned of a nearby French encampment and sent word to Washington urging an attack at Great Meadows, about five miles (8 km) east of Chestnut Ridge in what is now Fayette County, Pennsylvania (near Uniontown). Washington immediately ordered 40 men to join Tanacharison and at sunset followed with a second group, seven of whom got lost in heavy rain that night. It was dawn on May 28 before Washington reached Half King's Rock.

After a hurried war council, the English and Tanacharison's eight or nine warriors set off to surround and attack the French in the Battle of Jumonville Glen. The French quickly surrendered. The French commander, Ensign Joseph Coulon de Jumonville, was among the wounded. In one of several disputed and contradictory accounts, it is claimed that Tancharison uttered the French words, "Tu n'es pas encore mort, mon père! " (Thou art not yet dead, my father), then sank his tomahawk in Jumonville's skull, washed his hands with the brains, "and scalped him", but not before eating a portion of Jumonville's brain.

Tanacharison sent a messenger to Contrecœur, commander at Fort Duquesne, the following day with news that the British had shot Jumonville and, but for the Indians, would have killed all the French. Another (and more accurate) account of the Jumonville Glen encounter was told to Jumonville's half-brother, Captain Louis Coulon de Villiers, by a deserter at the mouth of Redstone Creek during his expedition to avenge his brother's murder.

Washington was without Native American allies on July 3, 1754 at the battle of Fort Necessity, his hastily erected stockade at Great Meadows. Tanacharison scornfully called the fort "that little thing upon the meadow" and complained that Washington would not listen to advice, and that Washington treated the Indigenous like slaves. He and another Seneca leader, Queen Aliquippa, had taken their people to Wills Creek. Outnumbered and with supplies running low, Washington surrendered the fort, later blaming Captains George Croghan and Andrew Montour for "involving the country in great calamity".

== Relationship with Croghan ==
Tanacharison had a long relationship with George Croghan, a fur trader, interpreter, and diplomat among the Native Americans who had been appointed a member of the Haudenosaunee's Onondaga Council. Tanacharison had been "one of the sachems who had confirmed Croghan in his land grant of 1749," 200,000 acres minus about two square miles at the Forks of the Ohio for a British fort. Thomas Penn and Pennsylvania planned to build a stone fort, but Croghan realized that his deeds would be invalid if in Pennsylvania, and had Andrew Montour testify before the Assembly in 1751 that the Indians did not want the fort and that it had all been Croghan's idea, scuttling the project.

In 1752, Croghan was on the Indian council that granted Virginia's Ohio Company permission to build the fort. Tanacharison's introduction of Croghan to the Virginia commissioners suggests that Croghan organized and led the 1748 Ohio Indian Confederation, which appointed Croghan as the colony's representative in negotiations, and that Pennsylvania recognized as independent of the Six Nations:

Brethren, it is a great while since our brother, the Buck (meaning Mr. George Croghan) has been doing business between us, & our brother of Pennsylvania, but we understand he does not intend to do any more, so I now inform you that he is approv'd of by our Council at Onondago, for we sent to them to let them know how he has helped us in our councils here and to let you & him know that he is one of our people and shall help us still & be one of our council, I deliver him this string of wampum.

The Ohio Company fort was surrendered to the French by Croghan's half-brother, Edward Ward, and commanded by his business partner, William Trent. The role of Croghan (who was Pittsburgh's president judge for Virginia and chairman of Pittsburgh's Committee of Safety after Pontiac's War) remains uncertain, since Croghan was later declared a traitor by General Edward Hand and exiled from the frontier.

== Last days ==
Shortly after the battle of Jumonville Glen, Tanacharison moved his people and the old queen Aliquippa east to Croghan's Aughwick plantation in the Aughwick Valley near present Shirleysburg, Pennsylvania. There Tanacharison became seriously ill and was taken to the farm of John Harris at Paxtang, Pennsylvania (near present-day Harrisburg, Pennsylvania). He would take no active part in the remainder of the war and died of pneumonia on October 4, 1754.

== Bibliography ==
- Anderson, Fred (2001). Crucible of War: The Seven Years' War and the Fate of Empire in British North America, 1754–1766. Vintage Books. ISBN 0-375-70636-4.
- Brands, H. W. (2002). The First American: The Life and Times of Benjamin Franklin. Anchor Books. ISBN 0-385-49540-4.
- Dockstader, Frederick J. (1977). Great North American Indians: Profiles in Life and Leadership. Van Nostrand Reinhold. ISBN 9780442021481.
- Hodge, Frederick Webb (1907). "Half King". Handbook of American Indians North of Mexico. Washington, D.C.: Government Publishing Office.
- McConnell, Michael N. (1992). A Country Between: The Upper Ohio Valley and Its Peoples, 1724-1774. Lincoln, Nebraska: University of Nebraska Press. ISBN 0-8032-3142-3.
- Misencik, Paul R. (2014). George Washington and the Half-King Chief Tanacharison: An Alliance That Began the French and Indian War. Jefferson, North Carolina: McFarland & Company, Inc. ISBN 978-0-7864-7950-4.
- Stanard, William G. (1906). "The Treaty of Logg's Town, 1752". Virginia Magazine of History and Biography. Vol. 13. Richmond, Virginia: House of the Virginia Historical Society. pp. 143–174.
- Wainwright, Nicholas B. (1959). George Croghan: Wilderness Diplomat. Chapel Hill: University of North Carolina Press. ISBN 9780807838389.
