= Custaloga =

Lenape chief

- Born: Pakanke or Packanke; Ohio or Pennsylvania
- Died: after October 1774; Custoga's Town in Mercer County, Pennsylvania
- Years active: 1753-1774
- Known for: Relations with Moravian and Catholic missionaries
- Title: Wolf Clan chief
- Successor: Captain Pipe

Custaloga (also known as Kustaloga, Tuscologas, Packanke, or Pakanke) was a chief of the Wolf Clan of the Delaware (Lenape) tribe in the mid-18th century. He initially supported the French at the beginning of the French and Indian War, but after Pontiac's War he participated in peace negotiations. He opposed the presence of Catholic missionaries, but later in life he became favorable to the Moravians. Captain Pipe was his nephew and succeeded him as chief.

== Biography ==
Thomas Hutchins' 1778 map of Virginia, Pennsylvania, Maryland, and North Carolina showing "Custaloga's Town" in the upper right hand corner, below Lake Erie.

=== Birth and early life ===
Little is known of the early life of Custaloga. Custaloga's family settled in the Ohio River Valley around 1740, and he may have been born there. He was born as Packanke into the Wolf Clan of his mother. The Lenape had a matrilineal kinship system, in which descent and hereditary leadership were passed through the mother's line. Children were born into the mother's clan and gained their social status there. Custaloga was raised among the Munsee division of the Lenape, which until about 1760 was only loosely associated with the Lenape living to the south and east. The Lenape warrior Keekyuscung once told a Pennsylvania trader that Custaloga was half Mingo.

=== Custaloga's Town ===
Around 1749, when Custaloga was living at Cussewago, (along French Creek, at the present-day site of Meadville, Pennsylvania), he established a sizeable village at the confluence of French Creek and North Deer Creek in Mercer County, Pennsylvania. This town, known as "Custaloga's Town," or sometimes "Ticastoroga," became his principal seat. The Seneca warrior Guyasuta is believed to have been buried at Custaloga's Town.

=== Affliliation with the French ===
Custaloga's name is first documented in western Pennsylvania's history in July 1753, when Pennsylvania trader William Trent noted that Custaloga's people were helping the French move their supplies across the portage at Fort Presque Isle. Some of the men at Custaloga's Town relocated to Fort Presque Isle and Fort LeBoeuf in order to work for the French in return for corn, clothing and muskets. On August 15, the French decided to occupy the trading post of John Fraser, an English fur trader who had lived there for several years, and who provided British trade goods to the residents of Custaloga's Town. Custaloga assisted the French by capturing and handing over two traders who had just arrived at Fraser's trading post. Fraser and his employee Willson were forced to flee, and 75 French soldiers took over Fraser's cabin, allowing Custaloga to confiscate Fraser's trade goods. Fraser reported that Custaloga was "made a Captain by the French."

In his journal of 1753, the 21-year-old George Washington describes his arrival at Logstown in November. Washington persuaded the Lenape chiefs at Logstown that they should side with the British in the event of war, and he recommended that they return strings of wampum that the French had given them as a sign of friendship. At that time, Custaloga was in charge of the wampum and kept the belts at his home in Custaloga's Town. He was in favor of remaining allied with the French, and when Washington visited him, he initially refused to give up the wampum, on the excuse that Shingas had sent no speech for the occasion, and had to be persuaded to do so by Christopher Gist. Washington, Guyasuta and Tanacharison took the wampum to the French commander at Fort LeBoeuf but the French would not accept it.

In February 1754 Custaloga was sent by the French to visit the construction site of a storehouse, built as preparation for the later construction of Redstone Old Fort by William Trent for the Ohio Company. Custaloga reported "a thousand men building a fort there," a significant exaggeration. He also stated that when Trent and his men finished the fort at Red Stone, they planned to "build another at the mouth of that same river," referring to Fort Prince George.

Custaloga was reported to have been present, on the French side, at the Battle of Great Meadows in 1754 and at the Battle of the Monongahela in 1755.

=== French and Indian War ===
In 1757, Custaloga adopted Christian Hochstetler, a 13-year-old Swiss settler who was taken prisoner after Lenape warriors burned his family's home during the Hochstetler massacre on September 19, 1757. In 1762, Christian's father Jacob learned that Christian was living with "King Kastateeloca" and petitioned Governor James Hamilton for assistance in getting his son back. Christian was released after a peace treaty negotiated by Colonel Henry Bouquet in October 1764.

In July 1757, Jesuit Father Claude Francis Virot founded a Catholic mission at Saucunk, and was joined for a brief period by Father Pierre Joseph Antonie Rouboud. Custaloga, known for his dislike of missionaries, reportedly became jealous of Virot's influence over the community, however, and the Jesuit was forced to leave after Fort Duquesne was captured by the British in November, 1758.

=== Pontiac's War ===
William Trent mentions in his journal that from July 22-24, 1763, during the Siege of Fort Pitt, "Custaluga" attended a council meeting with "Gray Eyes, Wingenum, Turtle's Heart and Mamaultee." There is some evidence that Custaloga was among the leaders of the Native American forces defeated at the Battle of Bushy Run in August 1763.

=== Postwar negotiations ===
During the various meetings with Bouquet in 1764, Tamaqua and Custaloga had central roles in mediating peace with the British. Custaloga, Guyasuta, Tamaqua, and Custaloga's brother Turtleheart met with Bouquet at his camp on the Muskingum River on October 17, 1764. Custaloga agreed to the release of eighteen captives. Other Lenape leaders, in particular Killbuck, considered Custaloga to be "an old Woman" for quickly agreeing to peace with Bouquet. Custaloga maintained his support for the French, however, as indicated by a report he sent to Pierre de Rigaud, marquis de Vaudreuil-Cavagnial, Governor General of New France, describing his meeting with Bouquet on December 4, 1764. In his report, transcribed by a French officer and sent under the name "Casteogain," he said that the British apologized for their intrusion into the Ohio Valley and, instead of expecting the captives to be returned, told the chiefs that those captives already adopted or married could remain with them, except for the aged, who would be returned once peace was confirmed. Custaloga also claimed that Bouquet openly requested Lenape assistance in persuading the French to abandon the Ohio Country. It remains unclear whether Custaloga was present at the meeting with Bouquet on December 4, or whether he heard this story from someone else or was, in fact, only telling the French what he thought they wanted to hear.

On May 10 1765, Custaloga attended a conference at Fort Pitt, together with Tamaqua, Netawatwees, Wingenund, Guyasuta, White Eyes, Captain Pipe, and other chiefs of the western tribes, for the purpose of resuming trade relations between Pennsylvania and the Lenape after the end of Pontiac's War. Since Custaloga had aided Pontiac in his rebellion, the Iroquois Confederacy sent the Seneca sachem Garistagee to live at Custaloga's Town, to maintain a watchful eye on Custaloga. By this time the Confederacy seemed to believe they had a kind of overlordship over the Lenape.

=== Relations with missionaries ===
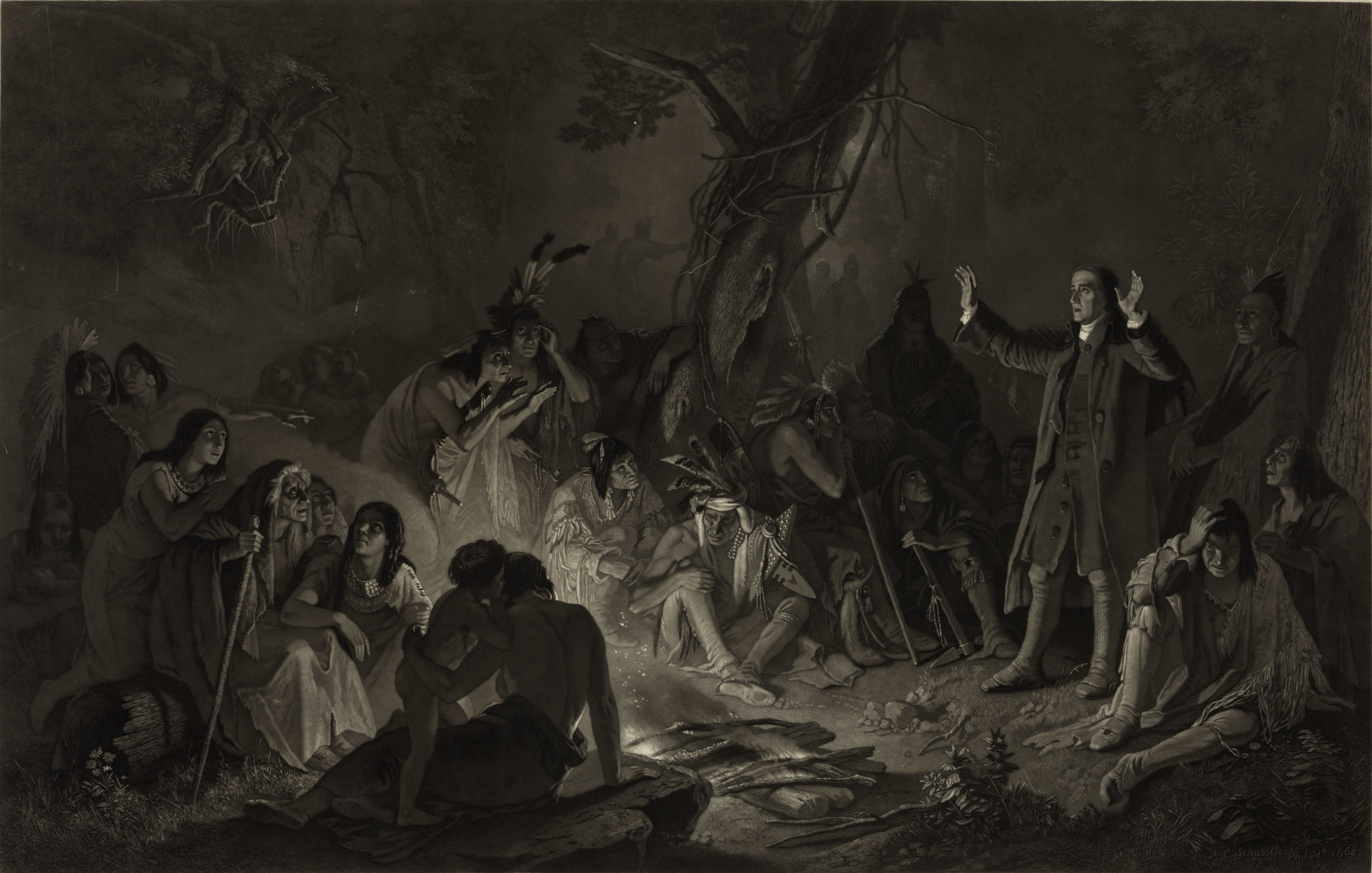
Moravian missionary David Zeisberger preaching to the Indians.

In 1769, Custaloga brought a small group of Munsees from the Cuyahoga River Valley to settle at the former site of Kuskusky, abandoned since 1759, probably in order to be near the English trading post at Pittsburgh. The growing influence of the Moravian missionaries at Freidensstadt caused many Munsees to relocate there, creating conflict in Custaloga's community. In 1770, Custologa's friend Glikhikan, a former warrior who served as a speaker for the Lenape community at Kuskusky, decided to confront the Moravian missionaries about their teachings, which he wanted to refute. He went to the Moravian mission at Friedensstadt and listened to David Zeisberger, planning to dispute the missionary's doctrine, but found himself persuaded that Zeisberger was telling the truth. He returned to Custaloga and announced that he planned to move to Friedensstadt, where he was eventually baptized. Custaloga was initially angry, but when other Lenape chose to move to Friedensstadt, his opinion of the missionaries grew more favorable. Shortly after this, he took Zeisberger to the valley surrounding the Beaver River, where the Lenape owned a large tract of open land, to which Zeisberger was given access. The Moravians established a town there which eventually became Beaver Falls, Pennsylvania. Soon afterwards, a dispute erupted among the Lenape over the growing number of Christian converts in Lenape communities, which sometimes led to conflicts as the Christians were opposed to the use of alcohol and objected to some traditional customs. At a Grand Council meeting in 1771, it was proposed that the Christians move to separate communities in the Ohio Valley. Custaloga opposed this, but eventually many Christian Lenape relocated to new communities on the Tuscarawas River and the Muskingum River in eastern Ohio.

In April 1771, smallpox began killing large numbers of Lenape. Custaloga argued that witchcraft had caused the epidemic and that "by embracing Christianity the contagion would cease." He even recommended that the Moravian preachers be adopted as full-fledged Lenape, and told his own children to listen to the missionaries when they preached. In 1774, Netawatwees sent Custaloga a message, asking him to convert to Christianity: "You and I are both old and know not how long we shall live. Therefore, let us do a good work before we depart, and leave a testimony to our children and posterity, that we have received the word of God. Let this be our last will and testament." Custaloga's son Eschenanahunt was baptized Isaac in 1775.

=== Later life and succession ===
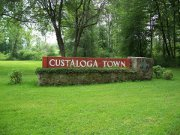
Sign at the site of Custaloga's Town in Mercer County, Pennsylvania.

By late 1773 at a conference of Indian nations at Fort Pitt, the tribe was discussing the succession of the aging principal chief, Netawatwees. George Croghan, sub-agent to Sir William Johnson, the Superintendent of Indian Relations, and Seneca representatives reported to Johnson about the debate. They wrote that Chief Custaloga was too old to replace Netwawatwees when that should become necessary. In January 1774, during a conference of the Six Indian Nations of the Iroquois Confederacy at Johnson Hall near present-day Albany, New York, Croghan announced that Custaloga was to be succeeded as chief by his nephew Captain Pipe, a noted war leader who had been nominated by Custaloga himself.

Following this date little is recorded about Custaloga. On May 1, 1774 a message was sent to Custaloga and various other Delaware leaders, apologizing for the Yellow Creek Massacre, and Custaloga replied from Custaloga's Town on May 16. On October 14, "King Custalogo" was among Native American leaders who met with Lord Dunmore in Williamsburg. After this, some sources think he moved to Custalogas Town, Ohio, then perhaps returned to Kuskusky. In February 1778, Custaloga's sister (the mother of Captain Pipe) was killed at Kuskusky during the Squaw Campaign of General Edward Hand. On November 29 1778, Colonel James Smith led 400 troops on the French Creek Expedition from Fort Pitt to Custaloga's Town, but found it evacuated.

Custaloga may have died as early as 1775.

== Legacy and honors ==
- Custaloga was a name given to a railroad station at the junction of the Lorain, Ashland & Southern Railroad and Pennsylvania Railroad in Wayne County, Ohio (1897-1925).
- A Boy Scout camp, Custaloga Town Scout Reservation, is named for him and located at the former site of Custaloga's village along French Creek in French Creek Township, Mercer County, Pennsylvania.
- Chief Pakanke is mentioned on a historical marker in Beaver, Pennsylvania, in relation to his expulsion of Catholic Missionaries from Saukunk.

Custaloga Lenape Chiefs - Wolf Clan
Preceded by unknown	Chiefs of the Lenape - Wolf Clan unk.–1774	Succeeded by Captain Pipe
