= Turtleheart =

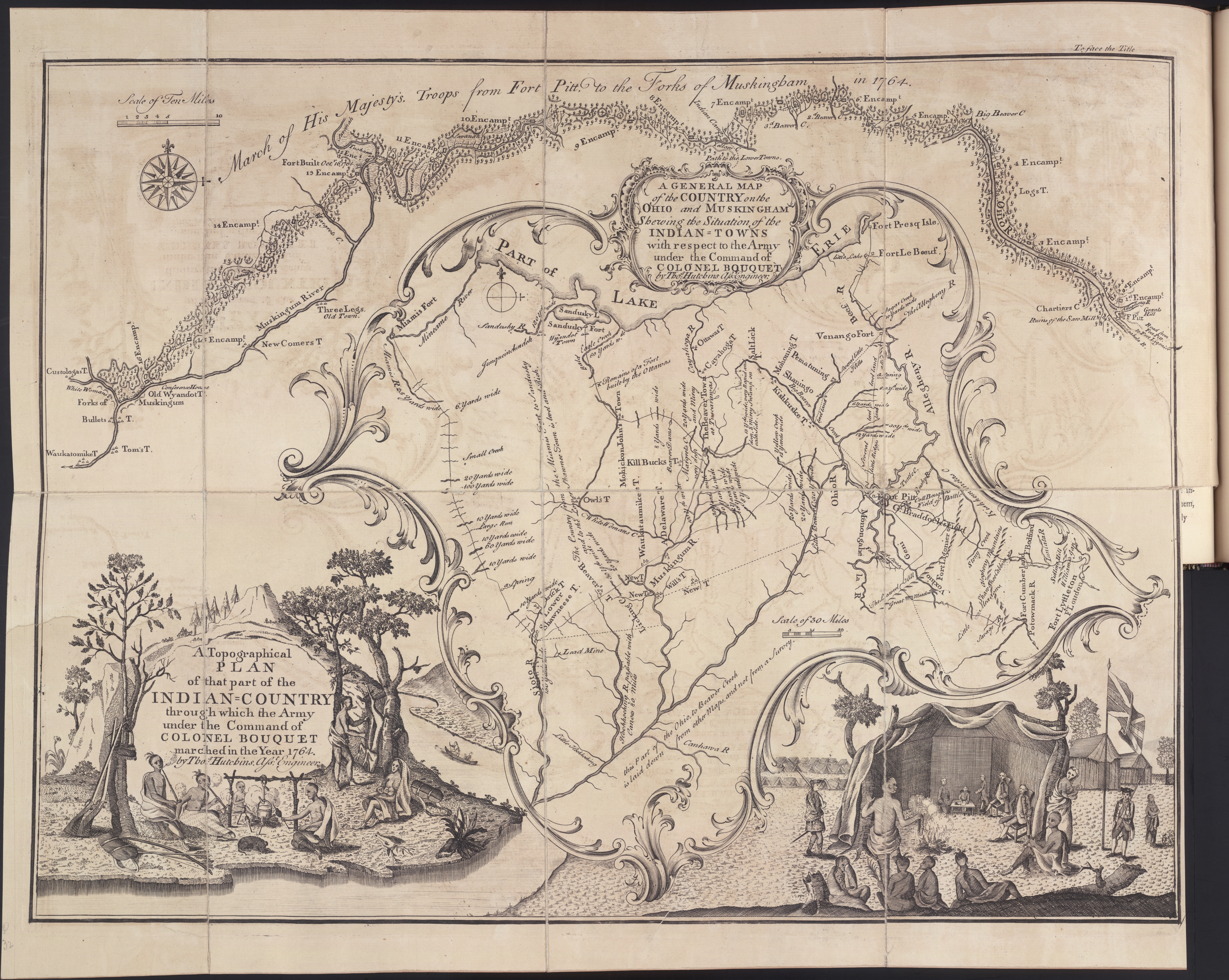
Thomas Hutchins Map of Henry Bouquet's 1764 Expedition

Turtleheart (Turtle's Heart or Tortle's Heart, his unami name was Tahkoxitèh) was a Delaware (Lenape) principal warrior and chief who lived during the French and Indian Wars, and Pontiac's War. He and Lenape Chief Killbuck represented the Delaware Nation at the Treaty of Fort Stanwix in 1768.

== Early life and family ==
Little is known about the exact date of his birth or death. Turtleheart was possibly the brother of Wolf Clan Chief Custaloga (Packanke) and perhaps the father or uncle of Captain Pipe, called Konieschquanoheel and also known as Hopocan. In 1763 he lived in the Lenape village of Shaningo located on a tributary of Big Beaver Creek. In the Journal of James Kenny, operator of the trading post at Fort Pitt, he writes, "This morning soon came over ye Allegheny Custologas' Brother & Son James Mocasin ye Tortles Heart & another Ind'n from Shenangoe."

== Pontiac's War ==
A.E. Ewing, descendant of Indian captive John Ewing, writes that "the new moon or 'Pontiac moon' of May, (13) 1763, had blood on it. The Algonquin chieftains, in secret council near Detroit, summoned by king Pontiac April 27, 1763, agreed to attack all the English posts recently surrendered by the French. A certain phase of the moon in May was to be the signal for a concerted attack. This was the beginning of Pontiac's War."

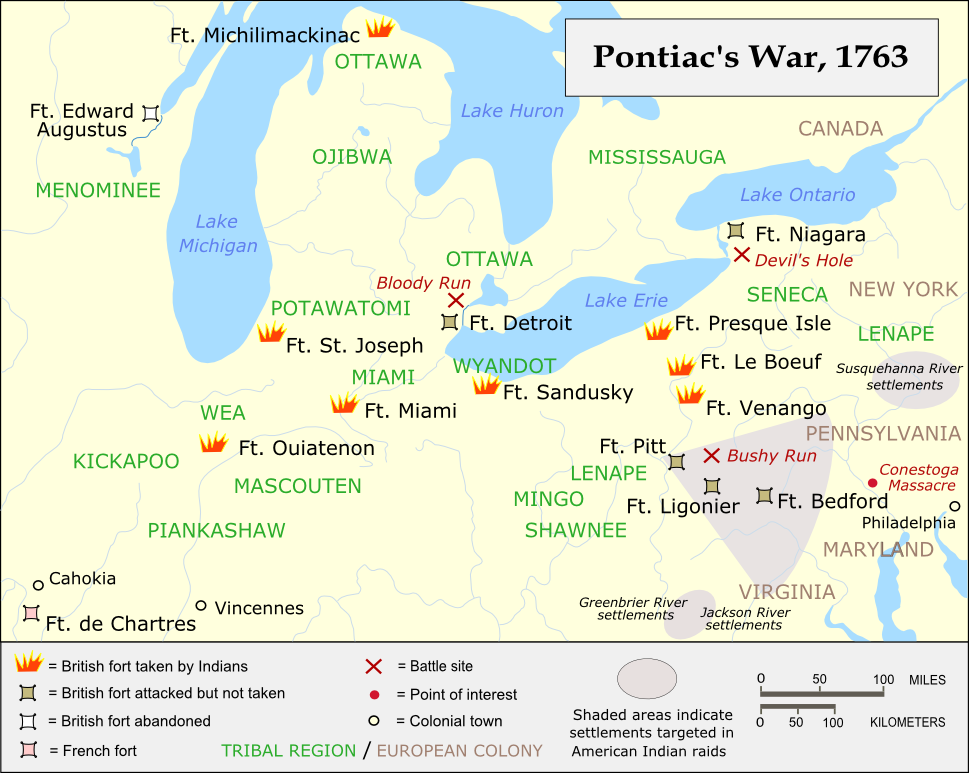
Forts and battles of Pontiac's War

Thomas Hutchins, Assistant Engineer and Map maker wrote in a letter to George Croghan "N.B. The Chief of the Musquetons spoke in behalf of their and the Pyankishaw Nations to the same Effect that the Ouitanons had done. Confirming what they said by giving. . some wampum 'a Council Pipe.' Late in the spring of 1763, nearly all the Western Indians, with the Senecas, rose against the English posts on the Lakes, the Allegheny, the Maumee, and the Wabash, killed or captured most of the garrisons."

The commencement wasn't concerned with just killing the garrisons at the Forts - but the extermination of some one hundred traders between Fort Loyall Hannon (Ligonier) and Fort Du Troit (Detroit). Indian Captive, John McCullough, after witnessing the shooting, tomahawking and stabbing of trader, Tom Green, wrote, "All the Indians in the Town immediately collected together, and started off to the Salt Licks, where the rest of the Traders were, and murdered the whole of them, and divided their goods amongst them, and likewise their horses. My adopted brother took two horse loads of beaver-skin and set off with them to Tus-ca-law-ways [Tuscarawas], where a number of Traders resided, and sold the fur to them." Of those traders, upon receiving payment, McCullough continues "However, as I heard, they went on safe until they got to Ksack-hoong, an old Indian Town at the confluence of the Beaver and Ohio, where they came to an Indian camp unawares. Probably the Indians had discovered them before they reached the camp, as they were ready for them. As soon as they made their appearance, the Indians fired on them. The whole of them fell excepting old Daniel and one [Thomas] Calhoon [and three of his men], who made his escape into Pittsburg."

On Day of May 27 James Kenny continues: "I went to ye Shore to meet them & invited 'em to our House to Deal, so most of them came; we Delt about 80 Pounds worth before Dinner; they were in an unusual hurry, bot a Good deal of Powd'r & Lead & want'd more Powd'r but we had it not well to Spair; they seemed in no bad humour but rather in fear & haste, ye Tortle's Heart did not cross ye river with ye rest but went to Allex'r McKee & asked him when he tho't to go down in ye Country, McKee answer'd in Ten Days; ye Indian desired he would go that Day or in four Days at furthest or else he should not expect to see him alive more & Signified as if ye Indians was just ready to Strike us."

In the report to Colonel Henry Bouquet by Captain Simeon Ecuyer, Turtleheart was responsible, at "Beaver Creek", for killing traders "John Calhoon" and "Tho's Coplin".

== Siege of Fort Pitt ==
Indians attacked Fort Pitt on June 22, 1763. Too strong to be taken by force, the British-held fort was kept under siege throughout July.

William Trent's Journal entry states that On June 24, "The Turtles Heart a principal Warrior of the Delawares and Mamaltee a Chief came within a small distance of the Fort. Mr. McKee went out to them and they made a Speech letting us know that all our [POSTS] as Ligonier was destroyed, that great numbers of Indians [were coming and] that out of regard to us, they had prevailed on 6 Nations [not to] attack us but give us time to go down the Country and they desired we would set of immediately. The Commanding Officer thanked them, let them know that we had everything we wanted, that we could defend it against all the Indians in the Woods, that we had three large Armys marching to Chastise those Indians that had struck us, told them to take care of their Women and Children, but not to tell any other Natives, they said they would go and speak to their Chiefs and come and tell us what they said, they returned and said they would hold fast of the Chain of friendship. Out of our regard to them we gave them two Blankets and an Handkerchief out of the Small Pox Hospital. I hope it will have the desired effect. They then told us that Ligonier had been attacked, but that the Enemy were beat off."

On July 22 Trent wrote in his journal: "Gray Eyes, Wingenum, Turtle's Heart and Mamaultee, came over the River told us their Chiefs were in Council." Turtleheart therefore did not contract smallpox, nor did his colleagues.

== Treaty of Fort Stanwix ==
Turtleheart and Killbuck would represent the Delaware Nation at the Treaty of Fort Stanwix in 1768.

The Treaty of Fort Stanwix was held by Sir William Johnson, Baronet, with the Six Nations: Shawanese, Delawares, Senecas of Ohio and other dependant Tribes, at Fort Stanwix in the months of October & November 1768, for the settlement of a Boundary Line between the Colonies and Indians, pursuant to the orders of King George I.

On the 29th [of September] some Delawares arrived from Muskingham who left the Shawanees at Fort Pitt on their way to Fort Stanwix

30th The Bounds between the Mohawks and Stockbridge Indians were adjusted to mutual Satisfaction, and the latter returned home

At the beginning of October, there were 800 Indians assembled & continued coming in daily till after the Treaty was opened. The upper Nations still remaining behind through evil Reports, and Belts sent amongst them. Sir William dispatched Messengers to hasten them and held several Congresses with those on the spot, antecedent to the Treaty, for adjusting differences and preparing them to enter heartily upon business on the arrival of the rest

On 15 October Governor Penn urged by the Affairs of his Province set off for Philadelphia leaving behind him as Commissioners Messrs Peters & Tilghman.

By the 22nd there were 2200 Indians collected and several large Parties coming in the next day, amongst whom were all the chiefs of the upper Nations, Sir William prepared to open the Congress on the 24th.

While Turtleheart signed, he did not make a presentation at the Treaty.
