= Captain Pipe =

18th-century chief of the Algonquian-speaking Lenape (Delaware)

- Hopocan, Konieschquanoheel
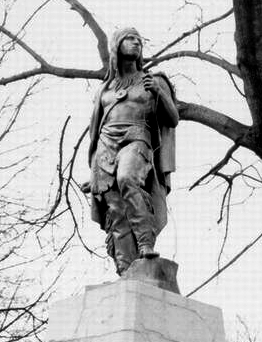
- Statue of Hopocan (Captain Pipe) in Barberton, Ohio

Lenape, Wolf Clan leader
- Preceded by: Custaloga

Personal details
- Born: c. 1725? or 1740
- Died: c. 1818?
- Relations: Uncle, Custaloga
- Children: Son, Captain Pipe, and other children

Captain Pipe (c. 1725? – c. 1818?) (Lenape), called Konieschquanoheel and also known as Hopocan in Lenape, was an 18th-century Head Peace chief of the Algonquian-speaking Lenape (Delaware) and War Chief. He succeeded his maternal uncle Custaloga as chief by 1773. Likely born in present-day Pennsylvania, he later migrated with his people into eastern Ohio.

Although Hopocan tried to stay neutral during the American Revolutionary War, after many of his family and people were killed in colonial American raids, he allied with the British. After the war, he moved his people fully into Ohio Country. He made treaties with the Continental Congress to try to protect Lenape land. American settlers continued to encroach on his people and territory.

In 1812 he moved with his people westward into present-day Indiana, where some accounts say he died. By 1821, most of the Lenape were forcibly removed to Kansas, which was considered part of Indian Territory. They and other Native Americans were under pressure from the United States to remove from all areas east of the Mississippi River. Congress later formalized this policy under the Indian Removal Act of 1830, signed by President Andrew Jackson.

== Biography ==
=== Early life and education ===
In Lenape culture, people did not share their real names, because it could give spiritual power to enemies. In addition, individuals were often given new names, or nicknames, at different periods of their lives, particularly to mark life passages, such as reaching manhood. Konieschquanoheel (meaning "Maker of Daylight") was born about 1725 or 1740; this was his real name. His "public" name was Hopocan (meaning tobacco pipe). Because of the translated meaning and his status as a chief, the British called him Captain Pipe. This name was documented in the colonial historical records.

Hopocan was born into the Wolf Clan of his mother, for the Lenape have a matrilineal kinship system of descent and inheritance. Children take their social status from their mother's family and clan. In this system, his mother's eldest brother was more important in her children's lives in the clan than their biological father, who was always from another clan. Marriages were exogamous, or outside one's clan. The uncle served especially as a male mentor to boys, bringing them into tribal male society.

Little is known of Hopocan's early years. He was probably born about 1725 near the Susquehanna River in Pennsylvania. His maternal uncle was Chief Custaloga, whom he later succeeded as hereditary chief, according to the matrilineal kinship rules. Captain Pipe likely spent his early years either at Custaloga's Town, along French Creek in Mercer County. He may also have lived at his uncle's other main village, Cussewago, at the present site of Meadville in Crawford County.

=== Career ===
The boy received the public name or nickname of Hopocan (meaning tobacco pipe). Captain Pipe, as the colonists called him, is first noted in historical records in 1759 among the warriors at a conference held at Fort Pitt, July 1759. Hugh Mercer, agent of Sir William Johnson, the chief British Indian agent in the Northeast, noted Captain Pipe among the attendees. Mercer had brought together the Six Nations of the Iroquois, as well as the Lenape and Shawnee, trying to secure their alliance with Great Britain during its Seven Years' War with the French (known on the North American front as the French and Indian War). The war lasted from 1754 to 1763.

Custaloga was known to have moved his band from French Creek into what is now Ohio. There is some evidence that he may have returned to Pennsylvania to the Kuskuskies Towns, on the Shenango River near present-day New Castle. These four villages had earlier been inhabited by Seneca people of the Iroquois League, but by 1756 they were settled by Lenape displaced from further east during the French and Indian War.

In 1762 the Lenape gave the Moravian missionary Christian Frederick Post permission to build a cabin on the Tuscarawas River at present Bolivar, Ohio. Hopocan was given the job of marking out the land to be given to Post. In 1765 the warrior was recorded at another conference at Fort Pitt, which about 600 chiefs and warriors attended; numerous women and children accompanied them. In 1768 he again met in a conference at Fort Pitt, held by George Croghan, a sub-agent of Sir William Johnson, British Indian Agent of the northeast and based in central New York. This meeting gathered more than 1,000 Iroquois, Lenape, Shawnee, Wyandot, and Mohegan together following the British victory over the French in the Seven Years' War. Britain proposed an Indian state to be reserved to Native Americans west of the Appalachians, and proclaimed it as off-limits to Anglo-American colonists. But the British colonial governments were unable to enforce restrictions against Anglo-American settlers in this area, who were determined to go to new lands. By 1773, Captain Pipe succeeded Custaloga as chief of the Lenape Wolf Clan.

=== Revolutionary War ===
During the American Revolution, Captain Pipe tried to remain neutral; he refused to take up arms against the rebels even after General Edward Hand killed his mother, brother, and a few of his children during a military campaign in 1778. Failing to distinguish among the Native American groups, Hand had attacked the neutral Lenape while trying to reduce the Indian threat to settlers in the Ohio Country, because other tribes, such as the Shawnee, had allied with the British.

In 1778 Captain Pipe was with White Eyes and Killbuck, contemporary Lenape leaders of the Turkey Clan, when they signed the first treaty between the Continental Congress and Native peoples. Later that same year, General Lachlan McIntosh, the American commander at Fort Pitt, requested permission from the Lenape to march through their territory to attack Fort Detroit, which was held by the British. Captain Pipe and other Lenape chiefs agreed, based on the Americans' building a fort to protect the Lenape from Native Americans allied to the British. In response, McIntosh had Fort Laurens built near the Delaware villages in eastern Ohio. He demanded their Ohio Country warriors assist the Americans in capturing Fort Detroit, and threatened them with extermination if they refused.

Believing that the Americans could not protect them from British-allied Native Americans, Captain Pipe and many other Lenape bands began to reach out to the British as allies. Also in 1778, Pipe and the members of his tribe who supported war, departed from the Tuscarawas area and relocated to the Walhonding River, about fifteen miles above the present site of Coshocton, Ohio.

In 1781 Colonel Daniel Brodhead attacked and destroyed this village, ending Pipe's neutrality. Captain Pipe became the leader of Lenape who supported the British and moved his people to the Tymochtee Creek near the Sandusky River. This village became known as "Pipe's Town." Present-day Crawford in Wyandot County developed near it. Captain Pipe spent the remainder of the war resisting American expansion into the Ohio Country.

In 1782, Pipe helped defeat the Crawford Expedition, headed by William Crawford. Seeking vengeance for the Gnadenhutten Massacre, in which nearly 100 Lenape were killed, the warriors marked Crawford for death by painting his face black after capturing him in battle. When they conducted ritual torture of Crawford before killing him, American witnesses say the soldier begged Simon Girty, a Loyalist interpreter, to shoot him. Controversy exists over Girty's role in this event. For further detail, see Wikipedia article on Simon Girty.

=== After the Revolution ===
Captain Pipe continued to resist white settlement of the Ohio Country (which by then the United States called the Northwest Territory).

In 1788 when settlers landed at what is now Marietta, Ohio, they found Captain Pipe and about seventy warriors encamped in the area. At that time General Josiah Harmar described him as a "manly old fellow, and much more of a gentleman than the generality of the frontier people." By this time he was being called "Old Pipe." According to the most reliable accounts, Captain Pipe was then about forty-eight years of age. During this time, he also resided at "Birds Run" and "Indian Camp", communities served by Ohio State Route 658, and "Flatridge", all three villages about 10 miles NW of present-day Cambridge. The Lenape held many ceremonies at these sites, and their artifacts have been found in archeological excavations at those locations. Captain Pipe was believed to have last visited around 1800.

In 1791, Captain Pipe participated in the battle that ended with St. Clair's defeat, and is said to have “slaughtered white men until his arm was weary with the work.” He was likely also present at the Battle of Fallen Timbers.

Scholars think that between 1793 and 1795, Hopocan made his headquarters at Jerometown, Ohio. In his later years, he resided with his people on the upper branches of the Mohican, the head branches of the Black, the Vermillion and the Cuyahoga rivers, all in Ohio. In 1808-09 early white settlers to the area of what is now Jeromesville in Ashland County, on the Jerome Fork of the Mohican River, found Lenape people living at the old Mohican village of Johnstown. (This was about three-fourths of a mile southwest of the present-day Jeromesville). The home of Old Captain Pipe was located nearby, as reported in stories of the settlers and the Lenape, who said he lived there until 1812.

By the 1810s and 1820s, Captain Pipe realized his people had little chance against the Americans and began to negotiate treaties with the United States government. The pioneer settlers also violated the new agreements, moving onto land set aside for the Lenape. In the spring of 1812, Old Captain Pipe and his people removed westward again. Some reports say they lived near present-day Orestes in Madison County, Indiana, but others refute that. The Treaty of St. Mary's in 1818 gave the tribes three years before having to remove from Indiana to Kansas. They departed peacefully in 1821. Chief Pipe was said to have died around 1818 near Orestes and is supposedly buried there. Other reports claim that he removed to Canada and died there.

Captain Pipe had a son, also known as Captain Pipe, who signed many treaties and moved with the Lenape to Kansas.

== Bibliography ==
- Baughman, Abraham J. (1837–1913): "Pipe's Cliff", Ohio Archæological and Historical Society Publications: Volume 20 [1911], pp. 253–254.

Captain Pipe Lenape Chiefs - Wolf Clan
Preceded by Custaloga	Chiefs of the Lenape - Wolf Clan; 1774–1818	Succeeded by Hockingpomska
