= William Trent =

American fur trader (1715–1787)

William Trent (February 13, 1715 – 1787) was an American fur trader and merchant based in the colonial-era Province of Pennsylvania. He was commissioned as a captain of the Virginia Regiment in the early stages of the French and Indian War, when he served on the western frontier with the young Lt. Colonel George Washington. Trent led an advance group who built forts and improved roads for troop access and defense of the western territory. He was later promoted to the rank of major.

Trent had gone into fur trading by 1740, aided by capital from his father, a wealthy shipping merchant of Philadelphia, who was the founder of Trenton, New Jersey. The younger Trent took on George Croghan, an Irish immigrant, as his partner, as he was effective in developing trading networks with Native Americans. Some of Trent's first land deals were of modest size, with the first three involving no more than four hundred acres of land each.

In 1744, Trent purchased vast lands in the Ohio Country west of the Appalachian Mountains. From then through the 1780s, he was a key figure in encouraging westward expansion by Anglo-American settlers past the Appalachian barrier, as he wanted to sell his land in parcels for development.

== Early life and education ==
Trent was born to William Trent and his second wife Mary Coddington on February 13, 1715, in Philadelphia, Pennsylvania. His father was a distinguished merchant and trader in Philadelphia, Pennsylvania. Trent was the second son born to Mary Coddington Trent, and was her only child to survive to adulthood. Her first son, Thomas, died in infancy. The children of William Trent Sr.'s first marriage were James, John, Maurice, and Mary Trent. However, by the year 1735, the three older sons had all died leaving William Trent Jr. and his sister as the only surviving children of his family.

Trent senior founded Trenton, New Jersey by buying a large tract of land in 1714 below the falls of the Delaware River and developing his country house there. Moving to the new site in 1721 with his family, Trent also platted the town around his house. The young Trent grew up with his father's wealth, gained from trading and shipping in furs, dry goods and slaves, with merchants and interests in the North American and Caribbean colonies, and England. His father had interests in 40 ships. His father served in the provincial governments in both Pennsylvania and New Jersey.

In 1752, William Trent married Sarah Wilkins. Together they had six children.

== Career ==
From 1750 to 1754, Trent and George Croghan were fur trading business partners. Croghan was more of the hands-on partner as he speculated that setting up trading post within Native American villages would generate more revenue as opposed to placing trading post alongside major crossroads.

In addition, Croghan learned the Unami language of the Lenape (Delaware) and the Mohawk language of one of the Iroquois tribes. He was also involved in land speculation, usually holding property for a short period of time. Trent on the other hand proved to be a financial resource because he had access to his merchant father's wealth. Therefore, Croghan and Trent's fur trading business was established in the Ohio Country using Trent's capital and connections.

Much of the upper Ohio Valley had been conquered by the Iroquois nations, based in New York and northern Pennsylvania, and they kept it open by right of conquest as their hunting ground. They had needed new grounds after exhausting some of the fur game to the east.

In 1744, Trent made large land purchases from Native Americans in the Ohio Country along the Ohio River, west of the Appalachian Mountains.

Trent was commissioned the rank of captain in June 1746 by the Philadelphia Governor George Thomas. Trent commanded one of the four companies that were tasked to defend against Canadian threats. Less than a year later April 7, 1747, while stationed at Fort Saratoga in New York, Captain Trent and his company were ambushed by two hundred French and Indian soldiers under the command of M. de St. Luc. With only sixty troops in Captain Trent's company, he and his men appeared greatly outnumbered.

After suffering the loss of eight soldiers, Trent was able to rally his troops and continue fighting until reinforcements came to their aid. M. de St. Luc had no choice but to withdraw his troops and retreat. In addition to losing eight troops at the battle of Fort Saratoga, nine more of Captain Trent's men were wounded and an additional six were taken as prisoners.

Shortly after, Captain Trent returned to his home of Pennsylvania and was honorably discharged from his duties in December, 1747. He was thanked by the House of Delegates for his valiant stand at Fort Saratoga. Just a couple of years later, in June 1749, Governor Hamilton declared Trent to be a justice of the court and he was tasked with keeping the peace in Cumberland county. The House of Delegates also appointed Trent as an official messenger for the Ohio Indians.

Just before the French and Indian War broke out, Captain Trent along with George Croghan and several other distinguished military men were present for the treaty signing at Winchester, Virginia, in September 1753. The Indian Winchester Conference established that weapons and ammunition would be given to the Miami and Delaware tribes. Andrew Montour, Christopher Gist, and William Trent were tasked with delivering the weapons and ammunition to the Ohio Indians. However, only the Delaware's expressed that their goods were received. In addition to the goods being delivered, it was also settled that Andrew Montour and George Croghan would travel to South Carolina and advocate for the release of warriors of the Shawonese Nation.

The Virginia Regiment recruited men in Virginia and Pennsylvania in 1754 before the outbreak of the war. As pay was low, there was high turnover in the lower ranks. Trent was commissioned as a captain and commanded a company, then likely 25–40 men. (Note: Early in the war at the least, a company commander of the Virginia Regiment did not command a large body of men. Lt. Col. George Washington's command was less than 200 after being reinforced. Trent probably commanded around twenty to twenty-five men, by today's measure, a large squad or a small platoon.) The young Washington was promoted from Lt. Col. to Colonel to command the Regiment.

When the Regiment moved across the Appalachian divide along Nemacolin's Trail, Trent was assigned to take the advance company. He established two forts that were later taken and destroyed by the French: Fort Prince George, begun February 17, 1754 and Fort Hanger. The first was built after Washington returned from his diplomatic mission warning the French to leave the Ohio Country. Trent and his forces built Fort Hanger (Hangard) later that year on Redstone Creek. It was at its confluence with the Monongahela River and near the Ford of the river by Nemacolin's Trail.

Trent and his men had not completed Fort Prince George when a large French military expedition of 600 soldiers, led by Sieur de Contrecoeur, surrounded the English colonists. They forced Trent to surrender and return with his men to Virginia. The French force included engineers. After demolishing Fort St. George, they began building the larger, more complex Fort Duquesne in present-day Pittsburgh. The English later captured Fort Duquesne during the war.

The officers of the Virginia Regiment decided to continue their campaign to secure the trans-Allegheny region for the Ohio Country. Their strategy was to build a wagon road to Redstone Creek, the nearest point of descent for larger traffic to the Monongahela River. After gaining reinforcements, they would attack and recapture the Forks of the Ohio. The Virginia Regiment began building a road from Wills Creek, intended to cross the mountains to Redstone Creek. Captain Trent was sent ahead with an advance party and supplies carried by pack animals, while Lt. Col. Washington oversaw the main column improving the road through the Cumberland Narrows Pass over the divide.

Wednesday May 1
George Washington's Regiment sets off from Wills Creek, now Cumberland, Maryland. Washington and his officers decide to press on regardless of recent French advances in the area particularly the beginnings of a fort at the Forks of the Ohio. Their mission was to construct a road to Redstone Creek in present day Brownsville, Pennsylvania and await sizable reinforcements. Then the army will go by water to take the Fort Duquesne at the Forks of the Ohio River from the French.

– Peter Koch, National Park Services

Trent's command made minimal improvements. He reached Redstone Old Forts, where he had his men build Fort Hangard, a blockhouse built out of logs felled along Redstone Creek.

Trent was a soldier of fortune during the various local Indian wars in Pennsylvania and present-day Maryland and West Virginia, and the French and Indian War. He commanded the militia at Fort Pitt during Pontiac's Rebellion.

During the siege of Fort Pitt, Trent recorded in his journal that blankets from the fort's smallpox hospital had been given to the besieging Indians during a parley. Trent wrote, "Out of our regard for them, we gave them two Blankets and an Handkerchief out of the Small Pox Hospital. I hope it will have the desired effect."

The full passage from the journal is: "The Turtles Heart a principal Warrior of the Delawares and Mamaltee a Chief came within a small distance of the Fort Mr. McKee went out to them and they made a Speech letting us know that all our [posts] as Ligonier was destroyed, that great numbers of Indians [were coming and] that out of regard to us, they had prevailed on Six Nations [not to] attack us but give us time to go down the Country and they desired we would set of immediately. The Commanding Officer thanked them, let them know that we had everything we wanted, that we could defend it against all the Indians in the Woods, that we had three large Armys marching to Chastise those Indians that had struck us, told them to take care of their Women and Children, but not to tell any other Natives, they said they would go a speak to their Chiefs and come and tell us what they said, they returned and said they would hold fast of the Chain of friendship. Out of our regard to them we gave them two Blankets and a Handkerchief out of the Small Pox Hospital. I hope it will have the desired effect. They then told us that Ligonier had been attacked, but that the Enemy were beat of". After the end of the war, Levy, Trent and Company, of which Trent was a member of, submitted a reimbursement invoice on which was written: "To Sundries got to Replace in kind those which were taken from people in the Hospital to Convey the Smallpox to the Indians Vizt." General Thomas Gage approved reimbursement to the company.

Trent, along with 22 other fur traders formed a group in 1763 that was known as the Indian Company. Because of the losses the Indian Company members experienced in the French and Indian War, they were seeking land grants. During this time, Trent's longtime friend and previous business partner, George Croghan, decided to embark on a journey to London and present the Indian Company's case. While Croghan was in England asking for reparations on behalf of the Indian Company, Trent immediately began concerning himself with new business endeavors in hopes to regain the fortune he lost during the French and Indian War. In December 1763, Trent began a partnership with John Baynton and Samuel Wharton. Samuel, Baynton, and Wharton were all equally interested in land speculation of 1,700 acres of Cumberland County land.

Despite Croghan's and William Trent's multiple efforts to attain restitution for the Indian Company's members, including efforts to establish a new royal colony on their land claims, they were unable to secure reparations. After several years of continuous efforts to regain his former fortune, in 1783 Trent's health began to fail him. That summer of 1783, Trent and fellow business partner, Samuel Wharton found that forgotten bonds and mortgages were soon to be overdue. Since the French and Indian War, Trent was never able to acquire lost lands or seem to get ahead of his debt collectors. Trent was able to survive for several more years in poor health until his final days in spring of 1787.

Trent's death resulted in his heirs and fellow Indian Company members continuing to fight for reparations under the new Constitution of the United States. However, despite the case being brought to the Supreme Court in 1792, the "William Grayson & others vs. The Commonwealth of Virginia" case was lost.
