= George Croghan =

Irish-American fur trader

- Born: c. 1718; Ireland
- Died: August 31, 1782; Passyunk, Pennsylvania
- Resting place: St. Peter's Church, Philadelphia
- Other names: The Buck, Anagurunda, King of the Traders
- Occupations: Fur trader, Indian agent, Onondaga Council sachem land speculator, judge
- Spouse(s): unknown; Catharine (Takarihoga)
- Children: Susannah, from first liaison; Catharine (Adonwentishon), 1759-1837

George Croghan (c. 1718 – August 31, 1782) was an Irish-born fur trader in the Ohio Country of North America (current United States) who became a key early figure in the region. In 1746 he was appointed to the Onondaga Council, the governing body of the Haudenosaunee, and remained so until he was banished from the frontier in 1777 during the American Revolutionary War. Emigrating from Ireland to Pennsylvania in 1741, he had become an important trader by going to the villages of Indigenous Peoples, learning their languages and customs, and working on the frontier where previously mostly French had been trading. During and after King George's War of the 1740s, he helped negotiate new treaties and alliances for the British with Native Americans.

Croghan was appointed in 1756 as Deputy Indian Agent with chief responsibility for the Ohio region tribes. He assisted Sir William Johnson, British Superintendent of Indian Affairs for the Northern District, who was based in New York and had strong alliances with the Haudenosaunee. Beginning in the 1740s and following this appointment, Croghan amassed hundreds of thousands of acres of land in today's western Pennsylvania and New York by official grants and from Native American purchases. Beginning in 1754, he was a rival of George Washington for influence in Ohio Country and remained far more powerful there for more than 20 additional years. During the American Revolutionary War in 1777, he was falsely accused of treason. He was acquitted the following year but patriot authorities did not allow him back in the Ohio territory.

Ohio's recorded history begins with Croghan's actions in the mid-1740s as fur trader, Haudenosaunee royaner, and go-between for Pennsylvania, according to historian Alfred A. Cave. Cave concludes that the treason charge that ended Croghan's career was trumped up by his enemies. Western Pennsylvania became the focal point in August 1749 when Croghan purchased 200,000 acres from the Haudenosaunee, exclusive of two square miles at the Forks of the Ohio for a British fort. Croghan soon learned that his three deeds would be invalidated if part of Pennsylvania, sabotaged that colony's effort to erect the fort, and led the Ohio Confederation to permit Virginia's Ohio Company to build it and settle the region. Late in 1753 Virginia sent George Washington to the Ohio Country, who would eventually end Croghan's influence there.

Braddock's Defeat in 1755 and French control of Ohio Country, which they called the Illinois Country, indicating the area of their greater settlement, found Croghan building forts on the Pennsylvania frontier. Following which he manned the farthest frontier post in present-day New York as Deputy Indian agent under Sir William Johnson, called the "Mohawk Baron" for his extensive landholdings and leadership with the Mohawk and other Haudenosaunee. Croghan briefly lived until 1770 on a quarter of a million New York acres. He resigned as Indian agent in 1771 to establish Vandalia, a fourteenth British colony to include parts of present-day West Virginia, southwestern Pennsylvania, and eastern Kentucky, but continued to serve as a borderland negotiator for Johnson, who died a British loyalist in 1774.

While working to keep the Ohio Indians neutral during the Revolutionary War, Croghan served as Pittsburgh's president judge for Virginia and chairman of its Committee of Safety. General Edward Hand, the local military commander, banished Col. Croghan from the frontier in 1777 on suspicion of treason. Despite his acquittal in a November, 1778 trial, Croghan was not allowed to return to the frontier. His death in 1782, shortly after the end of the Revolutionary War, received little if any notice. Although often quoted by historians, the story of Croghan's 30 years as the pivotal figure in Ohio Country history is only found in the handful of biographies.

== Early life and career ==
Little is known of Croghan's early life, including the names of his parents. He was born in Ireland around 1718. The best evidence for Croghan's age is found in the treasonous Filius Gallicae letters, written early in 1756 by an otherwise anonymous author. "France's friend" claimed to be nearly 38 years old, among other self-descriptions that pointed to Croghan, but a secret British investigation exposed the fraud. Croghan testified to his Irish origins in meetings in London in the 1760s. Croghan is a corruption and Anglicization of an older native Irish surname Mac Conchruacha

Apparently Croghan's father died young and his widowed mother married again, to Thomas Ward. Croghan emigrated as a young man from Dublin, Ireland to the province of Pennsylvania in 1741. His mother and step-father, his half-brother Edward Ward, and cousin Thomas Smallman also emigrated, the men working for him in America. Among relatives remaining in Ireland were a merchant, Nicholas Croghan (likely a brother of George); an aunt, Mrs. Smallman; and George's grandfather Edmund Croghan.

Within a few years Croghan became one of Pennsylvania's leading fur traders. A key to his success was establishing trading posts in Native American villages, as the French traders did, and learning their languages and customs. At the time, the usual British practice was to set up a post at a site for their own convenience, generally at a major crossroads, and wait for Native Americans to come to them. Croghan learned at least two Native languages, Unami (an Algonquian language common to the Lenape of the mid-Atlantic region) and probably Seneca (an Iroquoian language spoken by the westernmost Seneca nation of the Haudenosaunee), whose territory extended into what colonists called Pennsylvania. They also had hunting grounds in the Ohio Valley. These were the languages of the two major nations of Native Americans in the region.

Croghan also learned Native American customs, rapidly adopting the practice of exchanging gifts when he met with the people. He established his first trading base and wintered in a mostly Seneca village at the mouth of the Cuyahoga River on Lake Erie. (This area later developed as Cleveland, Ohio.) During the early years, Croghan's primary business partner was William Trent, also a trader. The son of the founder of Trenton, New Jersey, Trent likely supplied capital to acquire trade goods and set up their business.

== Marriages and families ==
Croghan married in the 1740s and had a daughter, Susannah Croghan. He later married again, while serving as Deputy Indian agent to Sir William Johnson, British Superintendent of Indian Affairs in the Northern District. His second wife was a Mohawk woman, Catherine (Takarihoga), daughter of Mohawk chief Nickus Peters (Karaghaigdatie). Their daughter Catherine (Adonwentishon) Croghan (1759–1837) would assume her mother's hereditary role as head of the Turtle clan. She later was the third wife of Joseph Brant, the prominent Mohawk war leader who led his people during their migration and settlement in Canada on lands granted by the Crown after the American Revolutionary War. Brant's sister Molly was a long-term consort of Sir William Johnson, so Croghan was doubly connected to influential British and Mohawk families in the East. Elizabeth Brant, a daughter of Joseph Brant and Catherine (Adonwentishon) Crogan, married William Johnson Kerr, a grandson of Sir William Johnson and Molly Brant.

== King George's War, 1744–1748 ==
Britain's blockade of French ports made the few French trade goods reaching Ohio Country prohibitively expensive; this resulted in a bonanza for the Pennsylvania British traders that alarmed the French. They knew that Native American trade and diplomacy were closely linked, and Croghan's activities from his base on the Cuyahoga River threatened French influence among the regional natives. As Croghan expanded his trading network westward toward Detroit, then held by the French, they encouraged French-allied Native Americans to attack him.

The British trader quickly took advantage of wartime conditions, establishing new posts at the Wyandot village of Sandusky and the Miami village of Pickawillany, tribes that had previously traded with the French.

His partnership with Trent was temporarily suspended when the latter joined the military to serve in King George's War (1744–48). The two men bought property on Conedogwinet Creek in present-day Cumberland County, Pennsylvania. Croghan developed a plantation there which served as his home and base of operations from about 1745 until 1751.

In April 1745 the Seneca protected Croghan from capture at the village on the Cuyahoga, but elsewhere French-allied Natives robbed a canoe-load of Croghan's furs. Croghan was adopted by the Seneca and in 1746, according to his testimony before the Lords of Trade in 1764, was one of their hereditary sachems among the 50 chiefs comprising the Six Nations' Onondaga Council. Already on it was William Johnson, the future British Superintendent of Indian Affairs in the Northern District, Croghan's superior. Their principal French competitor for influence among the Native Americans in the Ohio region was Philippe-Thomas Chabert de Joncaire, son of the French fur trader Louis-Thomas Chabert de Joncaire (1670–1740), another Seneca appointee to the Onondaga Council two decades earlier. That these men were members of the tribes they represented cannot be overemphasized in understanding their roles in American history.

Early in 1747, Seneca and Wyandot warriors murdered five French traders at the Wyandot village of Sandusky. This was the start of a regional Indian revolt against the French fomented by Croghan. The Wyandot chief Nicholas Orontony led it at first. He was followed by Memeskia (or "Old Briton" as Croghan named him), known by the French as La Demoiselle, who was a Piankeshaw Miami chief.

Unsuccessful in driving out the French, the participating bands became more closely aligned with the British. Reports claimed that Croghan had encouraged the uprising so that the Natives would trade with him and not the French. Old Briton relocated to Pickawillany on the Great Miami River, where Croghan built a stockade and trading post.

Aided by local Haudenosaunee chiefs Tanacharison (Half King) and Scarouady sent to oversee the Mingo and dependent Ohio Country nations, Croghan organized the Ohio Confederation of the region's tribes in 1748; they lit a "council fire on the Ohio River, independent of the Six Nations." Greenwood believes this was Croghan's initiative, as shown by earlier and subsequent events.

At the same time Croghan brought the Miami into an alliance with Great Britain, formalized in a July, 1748 treaty at Lancaster, Pennsylvania. Andrew Montour, a conference interpreter, became Croghan's closest associate until his death in 1772. The other interpreter, Conrad Weiser, had been appointed as British Indian agent for Pennsylvania.

Weiser held a conference in August 1748 at Logstown, on the Ohio River near its confluence in today's western Pennsylvania, to inform the recently allied tribes of the Ohio Confederation gathered at their capital that Britain had signed a peace treaty with France ending the war. As a result, the English had no more war supplies for them and he distributed gifts instead. Pennsylvania approved Weiser's recommendation that the colony appoint Croghan as its negotiator with the Ohio Country Indians. His success in that role should surprise no one.

The French attacked pro-British tribes left hanging by the peace without arms and ammunition to defend themselves. Celeron de Bienville led a 1749 expedition to claim the Ohio Valley for France and drive out the English traders; Governor James Hamilton (Pennsylvania), sent Croghan to Logstown to investigate. Days before Celeron reached Logstown, its chiefs sold Croghan 200,000 acres (810 km^{2}) in the area, excluding 2 square miles (5.2 km^{2}) at the Forks of the Ohio reserved for construction of a British fort.(A map accompanying the text for the first Pennsylvania Croghan historical marker may be found on the Critical Comments page of the ohiocountry.us website). Biographer Wainwright said gaining this huge amount of land was "a momentous event in his [Croghan's] life," a gross understatement of its impact on history, namely the otherwise unlikely penetration of Virginia into Ohio Country.

Virginia's Ohio Company, which acted on behalf of the Commonwealth, sent agents Col. Thomas Cresap and Hugh Parker into the region, who made overtures to the Miami at Pickawillany. In a November,1749 letter to Pennsylvania's governor, Croghan offered to oppose them. Not long thereafter he learned that his 200,000 acres (810 km^{2}) in Indian grants were against Pennsylvania statutes, as the colony tried to protect the natives, but were permitted in Virginia. By 1750 he and Montour were aiding the Virginia Commonwealth, guiding its scout Christopher Gist on a tour of Ohio Indian villages.

Croghan had already informed Pennsylvania Governor Hamilton that the Ohio Confederation wanted a British fort at the Forks of the Ohio. During a Logstown conference at the end of May 1751, he formally recorded the request and sent Andrew Montour to the Pennsylvania Assembly to confirm it. Montour, however, denied that the Indians wanted a fort, claiming that it was all Croghan's idea. The colony's plans for a fort evaporated as Pennsylvania "defaulted its leadership in the West to Virginia's Ohio Company."

Croghan protested and among other things had Montour retract his testimony before the Pennsylvania Assembly, but no one believed it. Evidence of the underhanded charade is found in the Native American conference held in June 1752 at Logstown (the Treaty of Logstown), with Croghan serving on the Indian Council and Andrew Montour acting as translator. The Ohio Confederation gave Virginia's Ohio Company permission to build a fort and settle one hundred families on 500,000 acres (2,000 km^{2}) in today's Western Pennsylvania. Immediately after the conference, a French force led by Charles Langlade made a Raid on Pickawillany, killing a few British traders and 13 Miami, including Old Briton.

Early in the spring of 1753, Canada's Governor Duquesne "opened his campaign to drive the English out of the Ohio Valley." That October during a conference held at Carlisle, Pennsylvania, Scarouady officially appointed Croghan as the representative of the Ohio Confederation in communications to and from Pennsylvania, and authorized him to receive its gifts for the tribes. His biographer Wainwright says this suggests that he organized his own appointment.

When the year ended with 21-year-old George Washington making his diplomatic journey to the French at Fort Le Boeuf, Croghan, about 35, had been operating in Ohio Country for twelve years, and was the leading figure among its British traders, Native American tribes and bands, and colonial agents. Soon after Washington returned from delivering Virginia Governor Dinwiddie's summons to the French, Croghan was in Ohio Country gathering intelligence for Pennsylvania, helping to build the Ohio Company stockade commanded by William Trent, and supplying the Indians with food, rum, and weapons. When the French reached the Forks of the Ohio early that spring, Croghan's half-brother Ensign Edward Ward was in charge of the garrison and forced to surrender.

== Seven Years' War ==
The Seven Years' War (1756–1763) in North America, or French and Indian War as this front was known in the colonies, unofficially began in 1754 with the Battle of Jumonville Glen and effectively ended in 1760 with the British capture of Montreal. French forces occupied the Ohio Country and expelled or arrested British fur traders.

By the end of May, Croghan and Montour were in Winchester, Virginia, where Governor Dinwiddie commissioned them as captains under Col. George Washington. Croghan was to supply flour for the expedition and advise Washington on Indian affairs. Washington alienated his Indian allies during a crucial conference at Gist's plantation and blamed Croghan for the subsequent defeat at Fort Necessity. The Half King and Queen Aliquippa took their people to Croghan's plantation on Aughwick Creek, seeking refuge. The Half-King became fatally ill and died that October, followed by the Queen in late December.

During the Braddock Expedition in 1755, Croghan, assisted by Montour, led eight Indian scouts, the same group who had been with the Half King at Jumonville Glen a year earlier. General Braddock alienated the other friendly Indians, yet Montour and the handful with Croghan attended the gravely wounded general. Teamsters Daniel Boone and Daniel Morgan fled on horseback as Croghan pressed Braddock to relinquish command and, despite the general's refusal, apparently took charge. He got Braddock off the battlefield with the help of Braddock's aide, the 23-year-old Washington. Washington's account differs and his biographer James Flexner does not mention Croghan being present. Captains Croghan and Montour were there, outranked the General's aide, and worked together to save Braddock, with Croghan the more likely leader in the emergency. It was a familiar role, one Croghan assumed on the Pennsylvania frontier a year earlier, and during the almost continuous crises in Ohio Country before and after until 1777.

In 1755, friendly Indians again sought refuge at Augwick. Croghan fortified it as Fort Shirley, one of four forts he built on the frontier. In 1756, he relocated to the western edge of the New York frontier, beginning a 15-year career as Deputy Superintendent of Indian Affairs under Sir William Johnson. Johnson appointed him to deal with the Susquehanna and Allegheny Indians.

With Montour at his side and in command of 100 Indians on an overlooking hilltop, Croghan witnessed in July 1758 General James Abercrombie's calamitous frontal assault on Fort Ticonderoga. Afterward Croghan wrote Johnson that he feared a similar "thrashing" for Gen. John Forbes advance forces nearing Fort Duquesne, unaware that Major James Grant had been defeated five days earlier. Claiming to be one himself, Croghan used his influence on the Indians at Easton, Pennsylvania, where the treaty that stripped the French of their local allies was negotiated, assuring Forbes' success. He then joined Forbes on November 20 with fifteen Indian scouts in his usual role at the head of the military column, likely the first to see that the French had burned Fort Duquesne to prevent it being used by the British.

Forbes assigned Croghan and Montour to bring in the regional Delaware warriors for a peace treaty with the British. Still under Col. Henry Bouquet's command early in 1759, Croghan gathered intelligence about the French force at Venango, "700 troops and about 950 Indians." About to overwhelm Pittsburgh in July, these French forces were ordered to relieve Fort Niagara, where they were ambushed and defeated by Sir William Johnson. The following year Croghan took part in the Montreal Campaign which resulted with the French capitulation to the British. Soon after Croghan accompanied Major Rogers on an expedition to Detroit which was also captured.

During 1761 and 1762, Croghan negotiated preliminary treaties with thirteen western tribes on behalf of the British Crown, gaining their acceptance of its assumption of rule in areas ceded by the French. These treaties were formalized in the September 1761 conference at Detroit, which was presided over by Sir William Johnson.

Croghan countered Seneca efforts to enlist the western Indians in an anti-British alliance; as he had in 1748, he organized the western groups into a confederacy independent of the Six Nations.

General Jeffery Amherst did not understand Native American culture, calling the practice of gift giving foolish, akin to bribery. He considered the cost of maintaining peace with the Indians exorbitant, and cut Indian Department expenses to the bone. By stopping gift giving, he insulted the Native Americans. (Croghan covered some expenses and wrote that he served "the King for nothing"). Amherst also severely limited the gunpowder and lead available to the Indians, thinking it would forestall future uprisings. But the friendly Native Americans needed these supplies to hunt and acquire game for survival, as well as to trade the skins and furs for necessities. Amherst ignored Croghan's intelligence that as a result, an Indian war was imminent.

The French had released all claims and trade relations to the British in the Treaty of Paris for all lands from the Allegheny to the Ohio River and Mississippi, most of which had already been sparsely settled by the British. After having achieved relatively amicable relations with the French, who had learned about their culture and with whom they had relations for a long time, they resented the patronizing and insulting treatment by Amherst and his officers. They complained he treated them like slaves and dogs. They joined Pontiac's War to expel the British from their territory.

== Pontiac's War ==
When Indian attacks engulfed Ohio Country in 1763, Croghan was in Philadelphia advising Governor Hamilton on Indian affairs and selling real estate. He galloped to Lancaster where word reached him that his business partner Col. Clapham had been killed in the region's initial attack, their Sewickley Creek trading post burned along with Croghan Hall near Pittsburgh, and that Fort Pitt was under siege.

General Amherst in New York ordered Croghan to Fort Pitt to investigate the causes of the uprising and Col. Bouquet to relieve it with a few hundred men. Croghan provided Bouquet with the latest intelligence from Carlisle. At Shippensburg he helped calm fearful residents by recruiting and arming 25 men to garrison Fort Lyttleton, abandoned in 1759. He also hired locals to carry ammunition and supplies from Fort Loudon to Bedford. He reached Bedford on June 12 and, believing further travel west too dangerous, he fed starving families and bolstered the garrison of seven soldiers under Captain Lewis Ourry. A few weeks later Indians attacked fifteen men mowing Croghan's fields within a mile of the fort, scalping two. Croghan refused Bouquet's order to march with his column when it left Bedford on July 27. Instead on August 2 he set out for Philadelphia to pursue private interests.

Denied leave by General Amherst to travel to London, Croghan resigned as Deputy Indian agent, angering Amherst. The general sailed to London on his own business. Croghan, accompanied by two officers recently besieged in Ft. Detroit and recalled to testify about the Indian uprising, set sail on the Britannia. The ship wrecked off the Normandy coast in January 1764. He survived, visiting Normandy historical sites on his journey to Le Havre, where he crossed the Channel to London.

While in London, Croghan was described as "the personification of wealth and power." The Lords of Trade declined Croghan's request to transfer his Indian grant of 200,000 acres (810 km^{2}) from the Ohio to the Mohawk River valley, refused to compensate traders for war losses, or to permit an Illinois colony. But the Lords agreed to free the Indian Department from military control and to consider moving the Proclamation Line of 1763, which was intended to prevent westward settlement by British colonists and keep peace with Native Americans, from the Appalachian Mountains to the Ohio River. As the months waiting on the Lords dragged by, a planned trip to Ireland to claim the estate of his grandfather, Edmund Croghan, was put aside, significant for showing that Croghan's extreme ethnic pride and possible homesickness were now secondary to his life in America.

Upon Croghan's return, Sir William Johnson ordered him to accompany Col. Bouquet's expedition against the Ohio tribes, but furnishing newly purchased Monckton Hall near Philadelphia was a higher priority. He assigned the negotiations to his assistant, Alexander McKee. Col. Bouquet, traveling east after his victorious 1764 Ohio campaign, was outraged to learn in a letter from Croghan to McKee that the Indian Department was now independent of local military control. Further incensed when the report was confirmed, Bouquet called Croghan "illiterate, imprudent [or "impudent," sources vary], and ill bred" in a letter to British General Thomas Gage complaining of the agent. Although Bouquet soon recanted, saying that Croghan was the best person to pacify Illinois Country, his ill-considered and untrue characterization of Croghan has endured.

From 1764 onward, despite continual provocations, the tribes were kept at peace on the frontier, largely due to the herculean efforts of Croghan. The exceptions were isolated incidents and Dunmore's War in 1774 on the Shawnee, when the former Indian agent worked to keep the Delaware and other Indian nations neutral.

Seen as a 1765 prelude to the Revolutionary War, Croghan's first shipment of Indian presents and trade goods to Pittsburgh provoked armed rebellion by frontiersmen led by James Smith. Played by John Wayne in Hollywood's 1939 version of the incident, Allegheny Uprising, Smith's hatred of Indians was long standing. At nineteen, as a captive in Fort Duquesne, Smith was traumatized by the screams of Braddock's captured soldiers being slowly tortured to death by Indian allies of the French. There were two justifications for leading the Black Boys in the attack on the British convoy, burning most of Croghan's gifts, and threatening his life if he ever returned to Cumberland County. Pennsylvania had proscribed trade with the Ohio Indians before a peace was established under a new treaty and as a Crown Indian agent, Croghan was prohibited from engaging in Indian trade. Without the trade and gifts, no peace treaty was possible and Croghan was quick to point out the threat to British rule.

Despite Black Boy opposition, Croghan accumulated enough goods to open trade with the Ohio Indians in Pittsburgh; he set off for Illinois Country. His party was attacked near the mouth of the Wabash River by eighty Kickapoo and Mascouten warriors. Two of Croghan's men and three Indians were killed, Croghan tomahawked, the camp plundered and the survivors marched to Vincennes and eventually Ouiatenon. In a conference on July 13, Croghan reconciled the Ottawa, Piankashaw, Miami, Ouiatenon, Mascouten, and Kickapoo Indians to British rule, a peace confirmed shortly afterward in a grand council that included Chief Pontiac. The principals journeyed to Detroit, where Croghan conducted an even larger conference that brought the Potawatomi, Ojibway, Wyandot, and Wea tribes into the British economic orbit, with Pontiac "playing an important part in the proceedings." At the time, Croghan was celebrated as a national hero for negotiating with Pontiac and ending the Indian war.

Croghan led a group of speculators, including Benjamin Franklin and his son William Franklin, in pursuing land in the Ohio Country, the Illinois Country, and New York. On September 6, 1765, Croghan was awarded a grant of 10,000 acres (40 km^{2}).

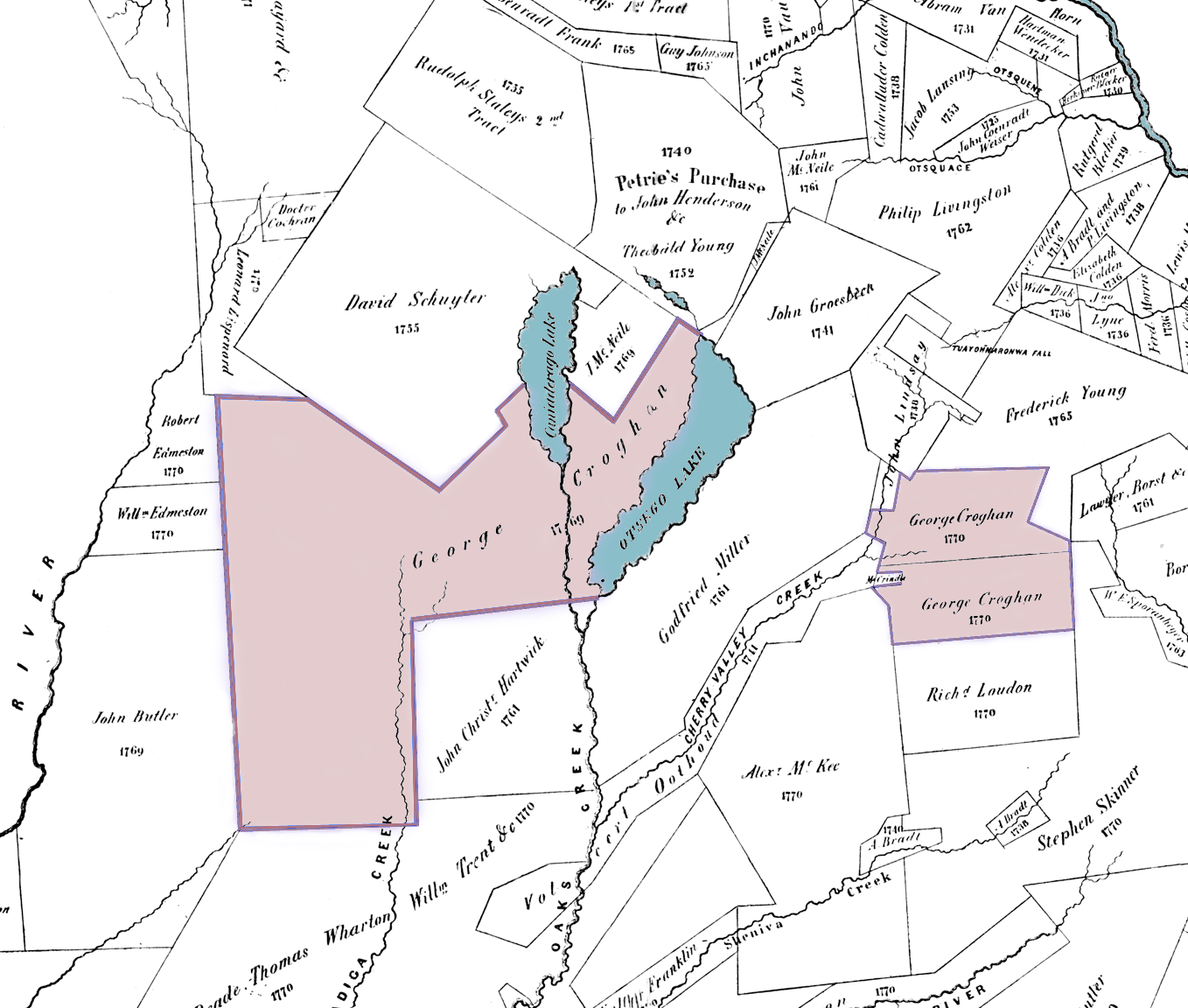
George Croghan's Otsego Patents

By Spring 1766 Croghan resumed his mission to the Illinois tribes on the Mississippi. Seventeen bateaux left Pittsburgh on June 18, one carrying Croghan and his party, another carrying Captain Harry Gordon and Ensign Thomas Hutchins on a river mapping expedition, two carrying provisions for Fort Chartres, and thirteen carrying Baynton, Wharton, and Morgan trade goods. They traveled north from the Ohio River on the Mississippi to reach the former colonial French settlement of Fort Chartres. During his August conferences there, Croghan successfully negotiated with 22 tribes, soon augmented by three Indian nations under French influence. Weak from malaria, Croghan accompanied Gordon and Hutchins to New Orleans. From there he sailed for New York with stops at Mobile, Pensacola, Havana, and Charleston.

== Later life ==
His ship reached New York on January 10, 1767, and two days later Croghan joined Samuel Wharton in urging Gen. Gage to establish an Illinois colony. When Gage refused, Croghan publicly resigned as Deputy Indian agent. Laid low by illness, he spent February recuperating at Monckton Hall near Philadelphia. In March he went to New York to visit with Sir William Johnson, who convinced him to withdraw his resignation. Sent to Fort Pitt in May, Croghan defused an Indian war over squatters and illegal trade. Governor John Penn detained Croghan in Philadelphia on his return east, with questions about the Indians to accompany the survey of borders between the colonies by Mason and Dixon, to settle the borders of Maryland, Delaware, Pennsylvania and Virginia (now West Virginia). He said of Croghan: "It would be very difficult to manage this business without his assistance." The Indians halted the survey before it was completed, in what was a vain attempt by Croghan to protect his 1749 grant by the Seneca for 200,000 acres from being included in Pennsylvania.

A hard year for Croghan's Indian diplomacy followed: the Black Boys' pledged in March to kill Croghan on his way to an Indian conference in Pittsburgh, and hostile Lord Hillsborough was appointed in London to the government portfolio for American affairs. Croghan established a quiet retreat at his large parcel of land at Lake Otsego. Its outlet is the headwater of the Susquehanna River. He built a six-chimney "hutt" and had Croghan Forest's 100,000 acres (400 km^{2}) surveyed in September 1768 prior to final discussions by Sir Johnson with the Six Nations of the Treaty of Fort Stanwix.

As noted above, before completion of the Fort Stanwix Treaty in November 1768, the Six Nations sold Croghan 127,000 acres (510 km^{2}) in New York bordering Lake Otsego, plus numerous tracts for his friends. At the large conference, attended by more than 3100 Haudenosaunee, the Six Nations demanded (on his part) that the Crown recognize these and other pre-treaty sales. They also asked that a grant by them of 2,500,000 acres (10,000 km^{2}) on the Ohio to Trent and his associates be made part of the treaty. Third, they wanted to ensure that should Pennsylvania seize the 200,000 acres (810 km^{2}) which the Indians had granted to Croghan at the Forks of the Ohio, they requested that the Crown grant Croghan as much land elsewhere. Sir William Johnson was censured by the Crown for aiding Croghan's private land dealings, and the government refused to ratify these private requests.

Facing bankruptcy, Croghan "drew bills payable on Samuel Wharton in London" for thousands of pounds in order to patent his New York land. Crippled with gout and hounded by creditors, Croghan sought refuge in Croghan Forest, which totaled more than 250,000 acres (1,000 km^{2}). Its remote setting did not protect him when the Wharton bills were returned for nonpayment in February 1770.

Croghan Hall gave the ailing Croghan a refuge from lawsuits and debtors' prison, but he could do little more than watch as settlers poured into the Ohio Country on land he considered to be his. Pennsylvania appointed officials for newly established Bedford County in 1771.

Among those buying land from Croghan's 1749 Indian grant was George Washington through his agent William Crawford.[13] "I am likely to sell another tract to Coll. Washington and his friends," Croghan wrote to Joseph Wharton Jr. and to Michael Gratz, "I have sold a parcel of lands to Coll Washington,"[14], but there were no further sales to him beyond 1,500 acres (6.1 km^{2}) in today's Perryopolis, Pennsylvania. Crawford surveyed land near Chartiers Creek for Washington that Croghan claimed when his survey of an Indian deed fell far short of the 100,000 acres (400 km^{2}) called for and he had it redone. More than twenty years later, in 1784, Washington won a court case against Chartiers Creek families who had bought their land from Croghan. Washington's document was dated July 5, 1775, two years after his land dispute with Croghan began.[15] It was made out by Lord Dunmore aboard a British warship on the James River, signed a few days after Washington had assumed command of the Continental army besieging Boston.[16]

Croghan's luck appeared to change when the Crown agreed to a new inland colony, Vandalia, appointing him as Indian agent and its largest land owner. Crown agents were restricted from forming such ventures, however, so Croghan resigned from the Indian Department on November 2, 1771. Alexander McKee took his place as deputy agent, with Croghan "on call when Indian affairs were critical." He took his cousin Thomas Smallman into a fur trading partnership and Croghan "made a major effort to liquidate his debts."

Although failing to sell any of his New York acres, Barnard and Michael Gratz remained Croghan's agents, creditors, primary suppliers and friends. He felt great sorrow at the loss of his friend Andrew Montour, murdered in January 1772. The British abandoned Fort Pitt that fall, and Croghan had McKee tell the Indians that it was done to please them. 1772 ended with "the news that the Privy Council had overruled Lord Hillsborough and approved Vandalia."

A year passed with Vandalia still in limbo. Croghan borrowed money and pawned his plate (silver), spending £1,365 for provisions and gifts for 400 Indians who attended his November conference regarding the proposed colony. "Convinced that the powerful Vandalia project had fallen through, Lord Dunmore, governor of Virginia, decided to make good his colony's western claims. Presumably, when Dunmore visited Pittsburgh in the summer of 1773, he met Croghan, for he agreed to recognize the validity of Croghan's Indian grant." Dunmore appointed an associate and nephew of Croghan as his western agent. Dr. John Connolly, fully supported by Croghan, "claimed Pittsburgh for Virginia in January, 1774, and called up the militia. The first men to appear at the parade ground for the initial muster came from Croghan Hall." Virginia's claim was opposed by Pennsylvania's General Arthur St. Clair, the colony's chief official west of the Alleghenies.

== Dunmore's War ==
Dunmore's War broke out in the Pennsylvania area in the spring of 1774, when frontiersmen led by Michael Cresap killed two Shawnee warriors, and Daniel Greathouse led other pioneers to kill the family of Logan, old Shikallamy's son. Croghan kept the Seneca and Delaware neutral, but his cooperation with St. Clair in defending the frontier prompted Connolly to accuse him of deserting Virginia. Shawnee chief Cornstalk, not wanting war, had three chiefs escort the traders from his villages to Croghan Hall. Connolly ordered 40 militiamen to capture or kill the Indians and they succeeded in shooting one of the Shawnee chiefs after they had escaped across the Allegheny. St. Clair, echoing other Pennsylvanians, said that Croghan was "indefatigable in endeavoring to make up the breeches."

That August deputies of the Six Nation brought the news of Sir William Johnson's death. He had died in July, the day before a sheriff's sale put over 50,000 acres (200 km^{2}) of Croghan's New York land on the auction block. Bids totaled £4,840 despite the pall Johnson's death cast over the proceedings. Many of the bids were never paid and the sheriff absconded with most of the money collected, leaving only £900 for Croghan. He raised $6,000 in Virginia to buy directly from the Haudenosaunee 1,500,000 acres (6,100 km^{2}) on the eastern bank of the Allegheny River. Samuel Wharton sent encouraging news about Vandalia, including the arrival of a large shipment of goods for gifts to the Indians and land payments, temporarily stored at Georgetown because of Dunmore's War.

Governor Dunmore reached Pittsburgh in September, pausing in his campaign against the Shawnee to grill Croghan concerning "Connolly's accusations about inciting the Shawnees to attack Virginia and siding with Pennsylvania against Virginia. Croghan easily disproved the charges and was reinstated in Dunmore's good graces." After bringing his war to a successful close that fall, Dunmore left 75 militia under Connolly to garrison Fort Pitt, renamed Fort Dunmore. The Virginia governor also adjourned the Augusta county court from Staunton to Pittsburgh, where he appointed Croghan to serve as president judge.

== American Revolution ==
Croghan chaired Pittsburgh's committee of correspondence, formed in May 1775 after the battles of Lexington and Concord. The next month, Croghan was hosting a conference with Indians to ratify the Treaty of Camp Charlotte when Connolly was arrested by Pennsylvanians and imprisoned at Hannastown. Croghan and his committee secured Connolly's release and Connolly subsequently left the frontier to join Lord Dunmore aboard a British man-of-war.

On July 10, 1775, Croghan purchased 6,000,000 acres (24,000 km^{2}) from the Six Nations between the Allegheny and Beaver rivers. Two days later, Congress established an Indian Department and appointed trader Richard Butler as its Pittsburgh agent. When Butler retired in April 1776, Croghan lobbied for his position. But, George Morgan was chosen as Indian agent and, still resentful for the failed Illinois trading venture a decade earlier, "had absolutely no use for Croghan."

During the summer of 1777, Croghan visited Williamsburg, Virginia, at the expense of the Gratz brothers to obtain a clear title to land he had sold them. After conferring with Governor Patrick Henry about frontier defenses, he returned to Pittsburgh with dispatches for General Edward Hand, who greeted him with suspicion. What was believed to be a Loyalist conspiracy had been uncovered. Colonel George Morgan, the Indian agent, Alexander McKee; Simon Girty, and others were under arrest. General Hand examined Thomas Smallman's papers and although there was nothing to indicate Croghan was disloyal, Hand ordered him to Philadelphia.

Two weeks after he reached the city, it was captured by the British. Croghan, too ill with gout to escape, was hauled before General Howe and castigated for chairing Pittsburgh's Committee of Safety and keeping the Lake Indians neutral. Ordered to take lodgings in town, where he was kept under constant supervision by two British officers, Croghan learned that Monckton Hall was burnt after the battle of Germantown, "another severe financial blow." When the British evacuated Philadelphia in June 1778, they left Croghan behind on parole. Returning Pennsylvania officials accused him of collaborating with the enemy, but Croghan was acquitted in a November 12, 1778, trial.

General Hand refused to let him return to Croghan Hall in western Pennsylvania, and Croghan spent the next two winters in Lancaster, Pennsylvania. In an effort to pay off debts, Croghan mortgaged Croghan Hall to Joseph Simon. He deeded 74,000 acres (300 km^{2}) of his Indian grant to the Gratzes, who paid his bills and financed another trip to Williamsburg to seek to have his Indian titles recognized by the state of Virginia, without success. Bedridden with gout upon his return, Croghan wrote few letters to family and friends. In May 1780, he moved to Philadelphia, where he learned his western properties were within the boundaries of the new state of Pennsylvania.

Croghan died at his home in Passyunk Township, on August 31, 1782. By then he was such an obscure figure that his death was not reported in newspapers. He was buried in the churchyard of St. Peter's Episcopal Church in Philadelphia. The marker on his grave was deteriorated by the elements, and the location was unmarked for many years.

== Croghan's estate ==
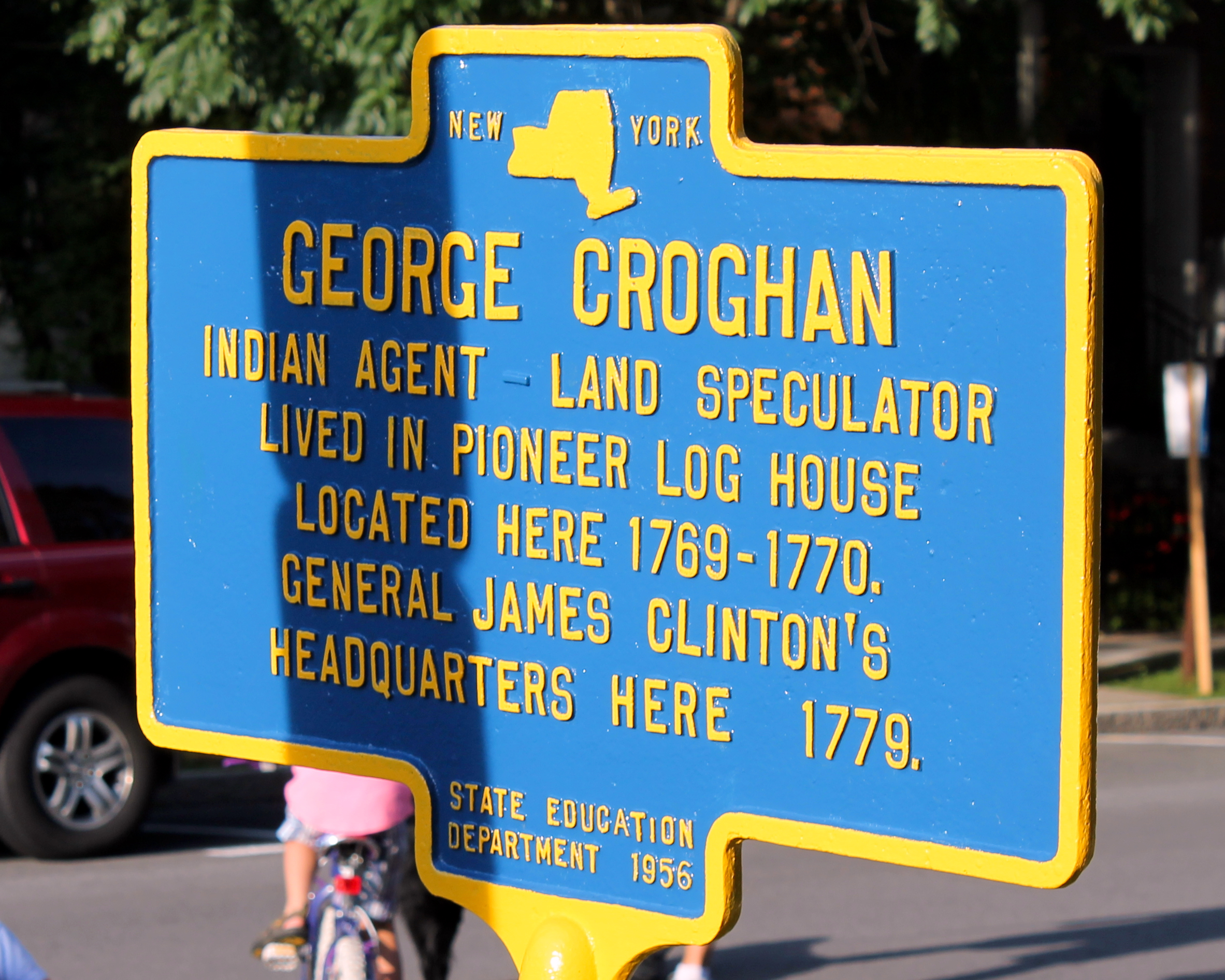
Historical marker honoring Croghan in Cooperstown, New York.

While the total value of his personal estate was valued at only £50 13s.6d, his extensive land holdings were "conservatively estimated at £140,000." Except for some specific bequests, his June 12, 1782, will left his entire estate to his daughter Susannah. Susannah Croghan Prevost died in 1790, survived by six of her twelve children. For decades, they pursued their claims to Croghan's often clouded deeds in numerous lawsuits. "For some years, the hopeless involvements of his estate kept courtrooms abuzz, and, when that ceased and his contemporaries died off, the man's name and fame faded away into the obscurity from which he had emerged."

Since the late 20th century, historians have re-evaluated Croghan's role and begun to assert his importance in the Ohio Country. He was a flamboyant character like William Johnson, brash and grasping, but also with a talent for diplomacy and relations with the Native Americans.

History continues to be made by Croghan descendants. To this day the female line of Croghan's Mohawk daughter Catherine are inheritors of her position and power in the Turtle Clan. "Catharine Adonwentishon was head of the Turtle clan, the first in rank in the Mohawk Nation. Her birthright was to name the Tekarihoga, the principal sachem of the Mohawk nation."[80]

Speculation in western New York lands and clouded titles resulted in many unscrupulous transactions. In 1786 William Cooper and his partner Andrew Craig "by questionable methods . . . purchased the Otsego lands [40,000 of Croghan's acres] for only £2,700." Cooper laid out the town of Cooperstown, New York, and built his mansion, Otsego Hall, on the former site of Croghan's residence. William Franklin and the Prevost heirs watched bitterly as the property increased in value twentyfold. "Andrew Prevost, Jr., wrote Franklin on December 12, 1812: 'We have lost an immense property from the infamous advantage taken by Cooper and others without your knowledge by a forced Sale under your Title.'" William Cooper's son, the author James Fenimore Cooper, presented his family's side of the dispute in his Chronicles of Cooperstown (1838).

== Pronunciation of name ==
There has been disagreement as to how to pronounce Croghan's name. The governor of Canada, the Marquis de Vaudreuil, in a letter to the Minister of France on August 8, 1756, referred to “George Craon’s fort”, which appears to be a phonetic spelling. Although biographer Robert. G. Crist concludes that, given the Gaelic origins of the surname, the pronunciation was “Crone," his evidence is less than conclusive: a financial account that one of Croghan's clerks labeled as "Crohan and Trent;" and "a Frenchman who recorded his name as "Croan," apparently the way it sounded. Descendants have used the hard "g" pronunciation favored by Croghan scholar Margaret Pearson Bothwell, but Crist dismisses them and "the practice in Ireland today," where the name is pronounced "CROG-han." "CRO-ghan" seems to be the standard English pronunciation. Crist cites Nicholas B. Wainwright's "Crowan" as an intermediate step between "something like 'Crohan,' and in further simplification, 'Crone.'" A study of Crogan's dialect by Michael Montgomery, a linguist specializing in Irish, written more than thirty years after Crist, does not find the name pronunciation dispute worth mentioning.

== Legacy and honors ==
- In 2008, the Sons of the American Revolution added a new marker to Croghan's grave.
- In 2012 a historical marker commemorating Croghan was dedicated at the veteran's memorial near Rostraver Township's borough building in Westmoreland County, Pennsylvania.
- In 2020, a historical marker, commemorating Croghan was placed at the site of his original trading post, in Mechanicsburg (Cumberland County), Pennsylvania.

== Sources ==
- Anderson, Fred. The Crucible of War: The Seven Years' War and the Face of Empire in British America, 1754-1766, New York: Knopf, 2000. ISBN 978-0-375-40642-3
- Aquila, Richard. The Iroquois Restoration: Iroquois Diplomacy on the Colonial Frontier, 1701-1754, Lincoln, NE: U. of Nebraska Press, 1997. ISBN 978-0-8032-5932-4
- Bothwell, Margaret Pearson. "The Astonishing Croghans," Western Pennsylvania History Magazine, 48(2), April 1965: 119–144.
- Campbell, William J. "An Adverse Patron: Land, Trade, and George Croghan," Pennsylvania History, 76(2), 2009: 117–140.
- Campbell, William J. Speculators in Empire: Iroquoia and the 1768 Treaty of Fort Stanwix, University of Oklahoma Press, 2012
- Cave, Alfred A. "George Croghan and the Emergence of British Influence on the Ohio Frontier", in Builders of Ohio, a Biographical History. edited by Warren R. Van Tine and Michael Dale Pierce; Athens, OH: Ohio State University Press, 2002.
- Crist, Robert Grant. George Croghan of Pennsboro. Harrisburg, PA: Dauphin Deposit Trust Co., 1965.
- Flexner, James Thomas. George Washington; The Forge of Experience, 1732-1775. Boston: Little, Brown and Co., 1965.
- Frederic, Harold & William C. Frederick III. The Westsylvania Pioneers, 1774-1776, Butler, PA: H.R. Frederic, 2001. ISBN 978-0-9703825-3-5
- Greenwood, Jim. "George Croghan; A Reappraisal." Washington, PA: Monongahela Press, 2009. ohiocountry.us.
- Hanna, Charles A. "George Croghan: The King of the Traders," The Wilderness Trail, Vol. Two, originally published in 1911. Lewisburg, PA: Wennawoods, 1995.
- Merrell, James H. Into the American Woods: Negotiators on the Pennsylvania Frontier. New York: Norton, 1999. ISBN 0-393-04676-1.
- Montgomery, Michael. "A Tale of Two Georges," in Focus on Ireland, Jeffrey Kallen, ed. Philadelphia, PA: John Benjamin Pub. Co., 1997.
- Silver, Peter. Our Savage Neighbors, How Indian War Transformed Early America.New York, NY: W. W. Norton & Company, 2009. ISBN 978-0-393-33490-6
- Sivertsen, Barbara. "Turtles, Wolves, and Bears - a Mohawk Family History," Westminster, MD: Heritage Books, 2006.
- Stevens, Sylvester and Donald Kent, eds. Wilderness Chronicles of Northwestern Pennsylvania. Harrisburg, PA: Pennsylvania Historical Commission, 1941.
- Taylor, Alan. The Divided Ground: Indians, Settlers, and the Northern Borderland of the American Revolution, New York: Alfred A. Knopf, 2006. ISBN 0679454713 OCLC 58043162
- Volwiler, Albert T. George Croghan and the Westward Movement, 1741–1782. Cleveland: The Arthur H. Clark Company, 1926.
- Wainwright, Nicholas B. George Croghan: Wilderness Diplomat. Chapel Hill: University of North Carolina Press, 1959.
