= Pisquetomen =

Lenape chief and war leader

- Born: Tulpehocken Creek Valley
- Died: c. 1762 (aged c. 51)
- Years active: 1731-1759
- Known for: Leading war parties during the French and Indian War, later promoting peaceful coexistence with English colonists

Pisquetomen (died c. 1762) was a Lenape chief who acted as interpreter and negotiator for the Lenape in dealings with the Provincial government of Pennsylvania during the mid-eighteenth century. After being rejected in his bid to succeed his uncle Sassoonan as Lenape chief, Pisquetomen joined Shingas and Captain Jacobs in a series of deadly attacks on Pennsylvania settlements at the beginning of the French and Indian War. He eventually participated in peace negotiations that led to the Treaty of Easton in 1758, and is believed to have died in 1762.

== Birth and early life ==
Pisquetomen, his older brother Nenatcheehunt, and his two younger brothers Tamaqua (known to the colonists as "King Beaver") and Shingas ("Wet Marshy Ground") were probably born in the Tulpehocken Creek Valley, in Berks and Lebanon counties, Pennsylvania. One source reports that Pisquetoman had six brothers (Tamaqua, Nenatcheehunt, Shingas, Buffalo Horn, Munhuttakiswilluxissohpon, and Miuskillamize). He and his brothers were probably the sons of a sister of Sassoonan, and grandsons of Tamanend. "Pisquetomen" means "he who keeps on, though it is getting dark." The Lenape living in that area were forced out in 1722 when Governor William Keith invited a group of German immigrants to move from the Schoharie Valley in New York to Tulpehocken. The Lenape already living there had objected that they had not given up the rights to that area and wanted payment. Pisquetomen and Sassoonan negotiated payment, and then relocated to Shamokin.

== Encounter with James Logan, 1731 ==
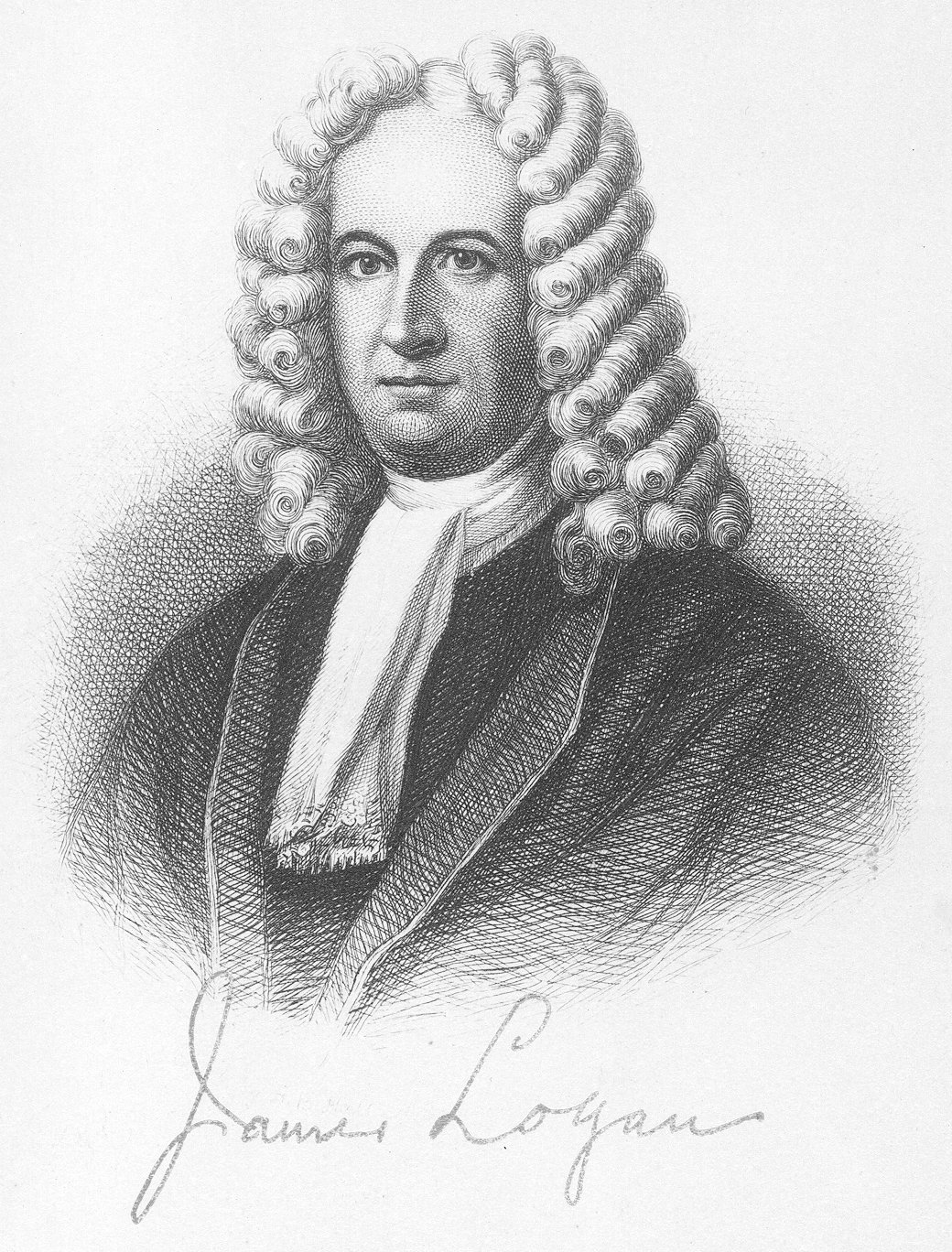
James Logan in about 1740.

In 1731, the Lenape chief Sassoonan visited Philadelphia accompanied by his nephew Pisquetomen, to meet with James Logan, an influential statesman who was then secretary for the Pennsylvania Provincial Council. Logan immediately disliked him, referring to him as "an ill fellow, [Sassoonan]'s next Relation." When he found out that Pisquetomen was Sassoonan's chosen successor, Logan objected, writing to Thomas Penn: "I concerted measures with Sassoonan, when returned to my house, to have that fellow laid aside and a better substituted in his place, which, 'tis hoped, may take effect." Pisquetomen spoke English well enough that by 1733 he served regularly as an interpreter at conferences in Philadelphia. Even though Logan mistrusted him, he had to admit that he was competent, writing: "They have no Interpreter but Pesqueetoman whom we too well know; yet he seems well enough inclined to interpret faithfully, the contrary of which is a very great crime with them."

== Role in the Walking Purchase, 1737 ==
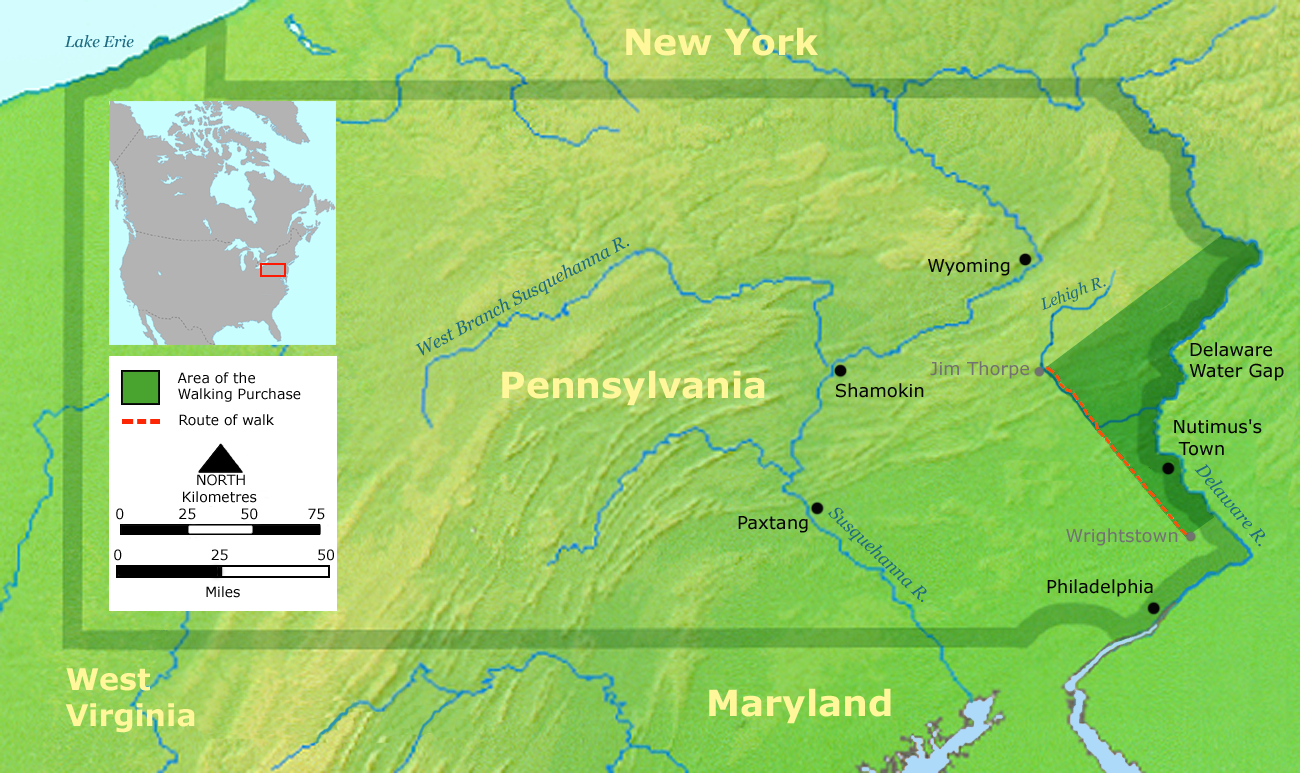
The area acquired by the Penns under the Walking Treaty of 1737, northern Delaware River sources along northeast border between the colonial Province of Pennsylvania and West New Jersey in the Province of New Jersey (shaded)

Pisquetomen served as the official interpreter for Chief Nutimus in the Walking Purchase negotiated between the Lenape and the Pennsylvania government in 1737. William Penn's sons John and Thomas Penn had uncovered a deed from 1686 supposedly proving that the Lenape had promised to sell a tract of land beginning at the junction of the upper Delaware River and the tributary Lehigh River (near modern Easton, Pennsylvania) and extending as far west as a man could walk in a day and a half. This document may have been an unsigned treaty or even a forgery, however the Lenape were persuaded to accept it, assuming that a man could only walk about 40 miles in a day. The colonists manipulated the "walk," however, hiring three runners who covered 70 miles, then claiming 1,200,932 acres, which covered all the Lenape's traditional homelands along the Delaware River. The Lenape protested but were eventually forced to relocate to Shamokin. Pisquetomen was seen as a likely successor to Chief Sassoonan, however the colonists were wary of his political influence and knew that he was embittered by the Walking Purchase.

== Rejection of Pisquetomen's nomination ==
In 1741, James Logan and the Iroquois vice-regent Shikellamy rejected the selection of Pisquetomen by Sassoonan to be his future replacement as the principal man of the Lenape. Pisquetomen moved to Kittanning—a town slowly becoming the center for Unami-speakers of the Turtle and Turkey phratries. The Lenape regarded Pisquetomen as "high in authority among the Delawares in the West," and Sassoonan believed him a perfect choice to be "the person who is to have the chief command and to be the mouth of his [Lenape] people."

Pisquetomen was also a Lenape leader who could unify the Lenape, both east and west. His experiences represented what the Lenape were facing in Pennsylvania. He had known displacement, when his people were forced from the Tulpehocken Valley in 1732, and then a sense of freedom and independence when he moved his followers west into Kittanning. But Logan saw Pisquetomen as an obstructionist to Pennsylvania’s political agenda, which favored Iroquois power on the frontier. Pisquetomen was not a pliable figurehead who would help the Six Nations control the Lenape. Most importantly, both Pennsylvania and the Six Nations saw Pisquetomen as a dynamic leader consistent with the obstinate and independent nature of the western Lenape, who could influence the eastern Lenape to adopt a stance of defiance. Logan, who wanted a leader with the influence and determination to recall all Ohio Lenape back to the Susquehanna region, quickly saw that Pisquetomen, like Sassoonan, lacked the will to bring the western Lenape home.

Pisquetomen’s rejection did not sit well with many western Lenape. They refused to accept a puppet chief assigned by the Iroquois and the provincial government in Philadelphia. Logan, Shikellamy, and Indian agent Conrad Weiser worked hard to block Pisquetomen’s appointment. Within a month of Sassoonan’s death in September 1747, Weiser considered Lappapitton "to be the fittest" as successor to Sassoonan. Lappapitton, out of respect for Pisquetomen, declined the offer.

== Interregnum 1747-1752 ==
Following the rejection of Pisquetomen, an interregnum existed among the western Lenape. They would not give in to the demands of the colonial authorities, but they also knew that until the crisis was resolved, the western Lenape were in a state of diplomatic limbo, and that they had no voice or influence with the Pennsylvania government. Patience wore thin within the alliance. Governor James Hamilton was eager to settle the matter and hoped they would choose a new leader acceptable to all parties: "You must inform the said Chiefs that...their Brethren in Philadelphia...advise them to recommend such persons to us...with whom publick business shall be transacted, and that their Brethren in Philadelphia will look upon them so recommended as Chief or Chiefs of the Delawares."

At the Logstown Treaty talks on May 28, 1751, George Croghan, speaking on behalf of the Six Nations and Governor Hamilton, asked the Lenape to "choose amongst Yourselves one of your wisest Counsellors and present to your Brethren the Six Nations and me [Hamilton] for a Chief, and he so chosen by you shall be looked upon by us as your King." Remembering the Pisquetomen debacle, the Lenape were hesitant. Tamaqua was aware of the importance of a leader who would represent all Lenape, east and west, and would negotiate their concerns with the Six Nations and Pennsylvania. He reminded Andrew Montour that "it would take some time to consider on a Man that was fit to undertake to rule a Nation of People" such as the Lenape, "but that as soon as possible they would make a selection." He also wanted a leader who was not opposed by the Pennsylvania-Six Nations alliance.

The interregnum continued into the spring of 1752. The second treaty talks held at Logstown ended the crisis. In May, 1752, Virginia commissioners met with Lenape at Shannopin's Town on the east bank of the Allegheny River (two miles from current-day Pittsburgh). They noted that the Lenape had no king, but were represented by Shingas and his brother Tamaqua, both of whom, supplied with coats and hats by the commissioners, "were dressed after the English fashion." Both wore "silver Breast Plates and [had] a great deal of Wampum about them." They made favorable impressions with the commissioners, who informed the Lenape that they were to meet the Six Nations at Logstown to improve relationships between the King’s representatives and the Ohio Indians.

== The Logstown Treaty conference, 1752 ==
At the Logstown Treaty talks in June and July 1752, the Ohio Land Company of Virginia and Virginia commissioners sought to gain confirmation of the 1744 Lancaster Treaty in which the Six Nations supposedly gave up territory to Virginia that bordered the Ohio River on the southeast. The Six Nations refused to attend, sending instead their "half-kings" (Ohio Senecas or Mingos) to supervise the affairs of the Ohio tribes and to protect Iroquois interests. Tanacharison, the Seneca supervisor of the Lenape, sensed that the Virginia commissioners were recognizing the prominence and autonomy of the Ohio tribes, so he made a point of asserting the rights of the Iroquois to administer the affairs of the Ohio Indians. Tanacharison scolded both the Lenape and Shawnees for their war excursions into Cherokee country after they had made peace with them: “I take the Hatchet from you; you belong to me, & I think you are to be ruled by me, & I joining with your Brethren of Virginia, order you to go to war no more."

The Iroquois "took it very ill" that the Virginia officials negotiated with other Indian nations "without first consulting them." They instructed Tanacharison to end the interregnum and select a leader acceptable to all parties. At Logstown, Tanacharison presented Shingas as his choice, arguing "that is our right to give you a King" to represent the Lenape in "all publick Business" between the Delawares, the Six Nations, and the British. He announced to the Virginia commissioners, "we have given our Cousins, the Delawars, a King, who lives there, we desire you will look upon him as a Chief of that Nation." Shingas was not present at that time. Tamaqua "stood proxy for his brother and was presented with a lace hat and jacket and suit."

== Participation in the French and Indian War ==
After Shingas was declared leader of the western Lenape, their relations with the Pennsylvania Provincial Council began to deteriorate. Some Lenape natives joined the war against Pennsylvania and the English after Braddock's defeat at the Battle of the Monongahela on 9 July 1755. On October 16, 1755, Lenape war parties from Kittanning led by Shingas, Pisquetomen, and Captain Jacobs moved east into the Susquehanna River region and entered the settlement of Penn’s Creek in current-day Snyder County. Lenape warriors entered the home of Barbara Leininger, smoked and drank with her parents and then announced, "We are Alleghany Indians, and your enemies. You must die." They shot her father, clubbed her brother to death, and took Barbara and her sister captive. Within three days, the Lenape destroyed most of Penn’s Creek, taking prisoners, burning farmhouses, and stealing horses.

Two weeks after the Penn's Creek massacre, Pisquetomen may have participated in one or more of the subsequent raids on the Scotch-Irish settlements in what is now Fulton and Franklin counties on the Maryland border (in what became known as the Great Cove massacre), and also in an attack on settlers along Swatara Creek in what is now Lebanon County and Tulpehocken Creek in Berks County.

== Adoption of Hugh Gibson, 1756 ==
Hugh Gibson, 14, was captured in July, 1756 by Lenape Indians, outside Robinson's Fort, near present-day Southwest Madison Township, Pennsylvania. His mother and a neighbor were killed by the Indians, and he was brought to Kittanning, where he was adopted as a brother by Pisquetomen (whom Gibson refers to as "Bisquittam" or "Busqueetam"). Gibson says that Pisquetomen was disabled due to "a wound received by his knife in skinning a deer," and adopted Gibson to assist him.

Gibson and Pisquetomen were living in Kittanning when it was attacked by Colonel John Armstrong's forces on 8 September 1756. After the attack, Gibson was taken to "Kuskuskin [Hog-Town] on the Mahoning." While there, Gibson one day remarked that "he had heard that the white people were coming against the Indians," which was overheard by Pisquetomen's brother and his wife, who said they would see Gibson burnt alive as soon as Pisquetomen returned from Shenango. Rather than have him killed, Pisquetomen instead took Gibson to live with him in a tent outside Kuskusky, probably to avoid a conflict with Pisquetomen's brother. Gibson wrote in his memoir that at this time, Pisquetomen "took a Dutch captive for his wife." Gibson reports that Pisquetomen spoke and understood English well.

In the spring of 1757 Gibson and Pisquetomen moved to Saucunk where they lived for a year. Although Gibson was theoretically Pisquetomen's adoptive brother, he lived much like a slave and was frequently threatened and abused. On one occasion, Gibson refused an offer of marriage to a Lenape woman, and Pisquetomen beat him with a hickory rod. In late 1757, Pisquetomen accused Gibson of planning to escape, and threatened to have him burned alive, until Gibson apologized. On another occasion, Pisquetomen accused Gibson of being lazy and beat him, knocking him to the ground and trampling him underfoot. Gibson shamed Pisquetomen by calling him "brother," and meekly accepting the punishment. Remorseful, Pisquetomen treated Gibson kindly after this.

In October 1758, after French and Indian forces were defeated in an attack on the British outpost of Fort Ligonier, Pisquetomen and Gibson moved to Muskingum. In March 1759 Gibson escaped, together with Marie Le Roy and Barbara Leininger and a Scotsman named David Brackenridge, and walked 250 miles to Fort Pitt (then under construction).

== Peace negotiations and the Treaty of Easton, 1758 ==
The English realized that the French needed Native American support to continue the war, therefore they initiated a series of negotiations with Lenape leaders in an attempt to make them withdraw from the fighting. Fearing that the ever-advancing European settlers would permanently take control of their lands, Lenape chiefs hoped to bargain for a binding treaty that would grant them protected space. Pennsylvania Deputy Governor William Denny asked Christian Frederick Post to act as negotiator at Kuskusky. Post was an experienced frontiersman and had two Lenape wives, spoke the language well, and the Lenape trusted him. He was instructed by Deputy Governor Denny to offer amnesty to all Lenape who had participated in frontier raids against Pennsylvania if they would now support the British. Pisquetomen accompanied Post and Keekyuscung to Philadelphia in July, 1758, to meet with Richard Peters and Deputy Governor Denny. Post then returned with Pisquetomen, and met his brothers Shingas and Tamaqua at the Kuskuskies on 12 August 1758. Post assured Tamaqua and the other leaders that the English wanted peace. Post continued down the Ohio to address other Lenape and their Shawnee and Mingo allies. Though well received by the Indians, Post had to be protected from the French by Pisquetomen and his warriors.

On October 8, 1758, an Indian congress met with colonial officials at Easton. In attendance were representatives from Pennsylvania, New Jersey, and New York along with Teedyuscung and the eastern Lenape, the Six Nations, Nanticokes, Mohicans, Wappingers, and a small western Lenape delegation headed by Pisquetomen and his council. In his speech at the conference, Pisquetomen reminded the colonial authorities, "Now you, Gentlemen, who are Head Men, sent Frederick Post with me, desiring me to take and carry him in my Bosom there, and when I came there, to introduce him to the publick council; I did this, and have brought him back safe again." The Treaty of Easton effectively ended Lenape involvement in the French and Indian War, and enabled Brigadier General John Forbes to capture Fort Duquesne in November without interference from local Indian tribes.

Following the conference, Pisquetomen and Post journeyed to Loyalhanna to request that the Ohio Indians withdraw from Fort Duquesne, as the British were preparing an attack and did not want any potential allies to be inadvertently injured. This time, they passed through several colonial settlements that Pisquetomen had attacked during the early years of the war, and Pisquetomen asked Post to protect him from any possible reprisals, thus reversing their roles as protector and protected.

Pisquetomen was also anxious that British colonists would move into Lenape territory, a concern he voiced when he asked two soldiers who accompanied Post, "...whether the General will claim the land as his own, when he should drive the French away," adding, "We are always jealous the English will take the land from us. Look, brother, what makes you come with such a large body of men, and make such large roads into our country; we could drive away the French ourselves, without your coming into our country." After the French withdrew from Fort Duquesne on 22 November 1758, Pisquetomen told Post that, for a lasting peace, the English "must speedily retire to the other side of the mountains," adding that if they did so, "I will use it for an argument with other nations of Indians." Post made no such promise, however.

== Final years and death ==
Pisquetomen is mentioned several times in the journal of James Kenny, a Quaker frontiersman who was hired by Israel Pemberton Jr. to bring supplies to the Lenape and Shawnee Indians in western Pennsylvania. In April and May, 1759, Kenny stayed at Fort Pitt, where he traded with the elderly Pisquetomen, as well as Shingas and Killbuck. Kenny reports that Pisquetomen "often called himself a Quaker," although it does not appear that Pisquetomen ever formally converted to Christianity.

Pisquetomen is believed to have died in 1762.

== See also ==
- Lenape
- Shingas
- Sassoonan
- Christian Frederick Post
- Tamaqua (Lenape chief)
- Treaty of Easton
- Walking Purchase
