= Tamaqua (Lenape chief) =

Lenape chief

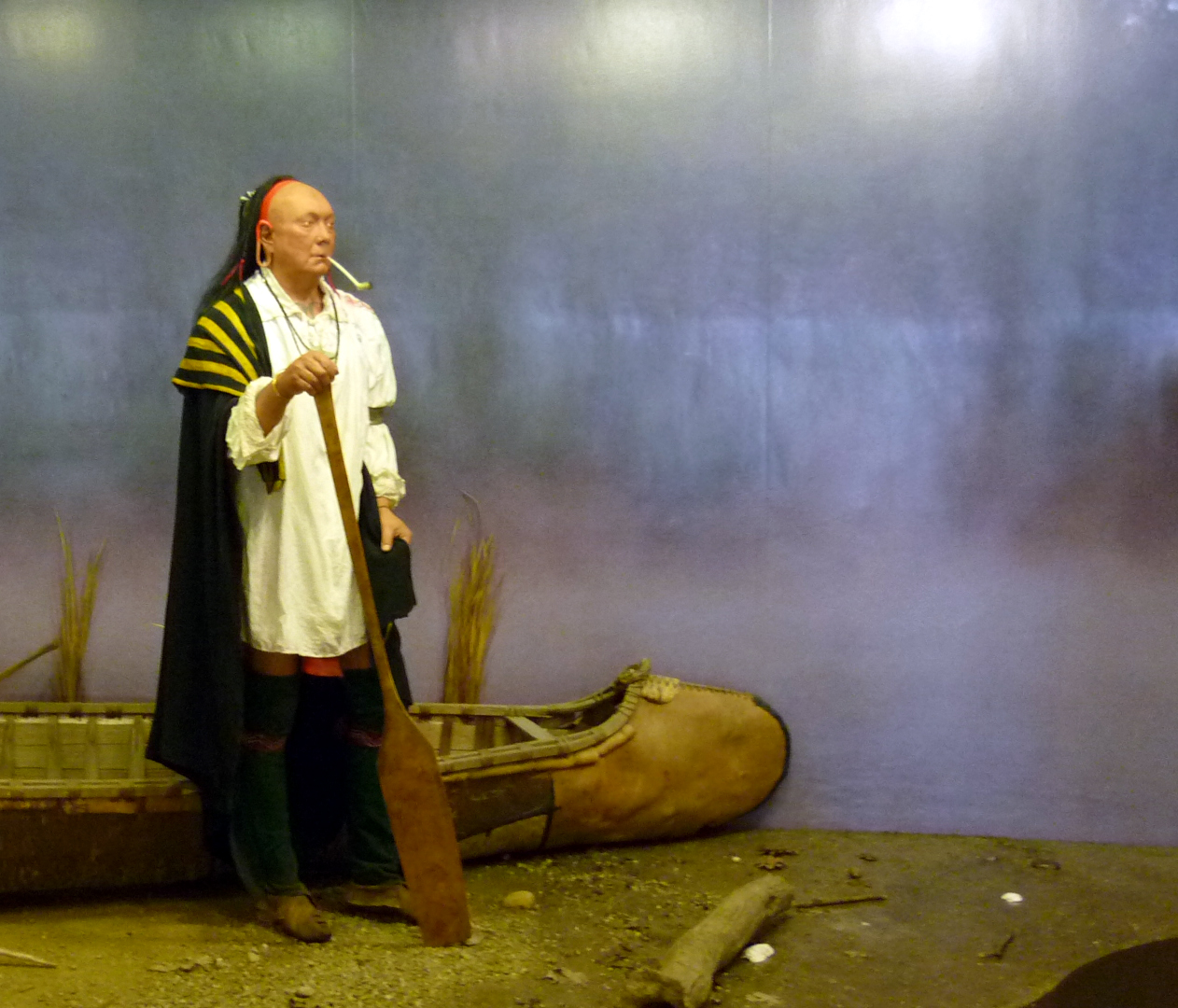
- "Tamaqua, a Delaware diplomat," exhibit at the Fort Pitt Museum, Pittsburgh
- Born: c. 1725; Tulpehocken Creek Valley
- Died: c. 1770 (aged c. 45); Tuscarawas, Ohio
- Years active: 1751-1765
- Known for: Peace negotiations during the French and Indian War and Pontiac's War
- Predecessor: Shingas
- Successor: Netawatwees

Tamaqua or Tamaque, also known as The Beaver and King Beaver (c. 1725 – 1769 or 1771), was a leading man of the Unalachtigo (Turkey) phratry of the Lenape people. Although the Haudenosaunee in 1752 had appointed Shingas chief of the Lenape at the Treaty of Logstown, after the French and Indian War Tamaqua rose in prominence through his active role as peace negotiator, and was acknowledged by many Lenape as their "king" or chief spokesman. He was among the first to hand over English captives at the end of the French and Indian War and was active in peace negotiations at the conclusion of Pontiac's War. By 1758, he was recognized as one of three principal leaders of the Lenape, being the primary spokesman for the western Lenape in the Ohio Country. He founded the town of Tuscarawas, Ohio, in 1756 and died there in 1769 or 1771.

== Birth and early life ==
Tamaqua was born and raised in the Tulpehocken Creek Valley, in Berks and Lebanon counties, on the upper Schuylkill River, with his uncle Sassoonan (Allumapees) and his brothers Shingas, Nenatcheehunt, and Pisquetomen. One source reports that Tamaqua had six brothers (Pisquetoman, Nenatcheehunt, Shingas, Buffalo Horn, Munhuttakiswilluxissohpon, and Miuskillamize). He was probably a son of Sassoonan's sister, and a grandson of Tamanend. After the Lenape were forced off the Tulpehocken lands in 1732, he lived for a time at the mouth of the Beaver River (near the present-day city of Beaver, Pennsylvania), then at Kittanning, Saucunk and Kuskusky, and later at Tuscarawas.

One source reports that Tamaqua had a son, who took Hugh Gibson captive in July, 1756, outside Robinson's Fort near present-day Southwest Madison Township, Pennsylvania. Tamaqua was married at least twice. James Kenny reported that Tamaqua's first wife was killed by wolves.

Tamaqua's name, sometimes spelled "Tamakwa" or "Tamaque", derives from the Lenni-Lenape word for "beaver," tëmakwe.

== Rise to prominence as Lenape spokesman ==
Tamaqua first appears in colonial records during talks at Logstown on May 28, 1751, a preliminary to the Logstown Treaty Conference of 1752. Since the death of Sassoonan in 1747, the Lenape had been without a leader. Sassoonan had designated Pisquetomen as his successor, but the Pennsylvania authorities had rejected him. Pennsylvania had recommended Lappapitton, but Lappapitton had declined. George Croghan, speaking on behalf of the Six Nations and Governor Hamilton, asked the Lenape to "choose amongst Yourselves one of your wisest Counsellors and present to your Brethren the Six Nations and me [Hamilton] for a Chief, and he so chosen by you shall be looked upon by us as your King." Tamaqua knew the importance of a leader who would represent all Lenape, east and west, and would negotiate their concerns with the Six Nations and Pennsylvania. He reminded Andrew Montour that "it would take some time to consider on a Man that was fit to undertake to rule a Nation of People" such as the Lenape, "but that as soon as possible they would make a selection." He also wanted a leader who was not opposed by the Pennsylvania-Six Nations alliance.

Under pressure from both the Six Nations and the colonial authorities, Tanacharison presented Shingas as his choice at the Logstown Treaty Conference in June, 1752, arguing "that is our right to give you a King" to represent the Lenape in "all publick Business" between the Lenape, the Six Nations, and the British. Tanacharison announced, "we have given our Cousins, the Delawars, a King, who lives there, we desire you will look upon him as a Chief of that Nation." Shingas was absent from the treaty conference, so Tamaqua "stood proxy for his brother and was presented with a lace hat and jacket and suit."

== Meeting at Aughwick, 1754 ==
In July, 1754, the Haudenosaunee at the Albany Congress ceded large areas of western Pennsylvania, where many Lenape were living, to the Pennsylvania colonial government, without consulting the Lenape. In August 1754, over two hundred Ohio natives met at George Croghan's home at Aughwick, to complain about this act, which would force the Lenape to move westward into French territory.

Tamaqua addressed both Conrad Weiser, who was acting in the capacity of a representative of Pennsylvania governor Robert Hunter Morris, and the Six Nations, reminding them of their obligations and that the Lenape looked to the Haudenosaunee for protection. He also noted that it was the Six Nations who had forbidden them to "mettle with Warrs." Tamaqua pleaded that because of the French presence in the Ohio country, "we desire you therefore Uncle to have your Eyes open, and be Watchful over us your Cousins, as you have always been heretofore." Tamaqua insisted that if the Haudenosaunee could not protect the Lenape from the French, then they should permit the Lenape to pick up a hatchet and defend themselves. Tamaqua then reminded Weiser of Pennsylvania's fair treatment of his people from the time "William Penn first appeared in his Ship on our Lands" and was accepted by the Lenape and Five Nations into a union of "lasting Friendship." He asked Weiser to tell Governor Morris that "we desire that you will look upon us in the same Light, and let that Treaty of Friendship made by our Forefathers on both sides subsist."

Tamaqua knew that western Lenape would not tolerate colonial settlements in the Ohio country. He hoped to prevent conflict by appealing to Pennsylvania to remember its traditions and history of fair treatment towards the Lenape. To avoid war with Pennsylvania, he was willing to acknowledge subservience to the Six Nations in hopes that they would intervene with Pennsylvania on behalf of the Lenape. Weiser's response to Tamaqua was to dismiss the Ohio natives, saying that they "had no business at the Treaty, and the Six Nations always declared them Hunters, and no owners of Land," meaning that the Ohio country was only a hunting domain of the natives, not a homeland. The meeting concluded with the western Lenape deeply dissatisfied and ready to form an alliance with the French.

== Role during the French and Indian war ==
After Shingas was declared leader of the western Lenape, relations with the Pennsylvania Provincial Council began to deteriorate. In 1755, General Edward Braddock told Shingas that only "the English Should Inhabit & Inherit the Land," adding that "No Savage Should Inherit the Land," and that he did not need the help of the Lenape to drive the French out. In response, many Lenape joined the war against Pennsylvania and the English after Braddock's defeat at the Battle of the Monongahela on 9 July 1755. In September, 1755, Tamaqua joined Shingas, Captain Jacob, and 150 Shawnees and Canadians in an attack on Fort Cumberland in Maryland. He may also have joined Captain Jacobs and Shingas for the Great Cove massacre on 1 November 1755. He is known to have led a band of Lenape warriors in the assault and capture of Fort Bigham on June 11–12, 1756, in which 19 civilians were killed and five captured. After this, however, he withdrew from the war parties and remained at Kittanning in an administrative role. His nonparticipation in the war lent him greater credibility in later years during peace negotiations, whereas Shingas and Pisquetomen were both remembered for their raids on Pennsylvania settlements.

== Role as a negotiator ==
Tamaqua was living at Kittanning when it was destroyed in September, 1756. He then moved to Ohio and established the town of Tuscarawas, which was initially known as "Beaver's Town," and later, "King Beaver's Town." Shingas feared for his life when the Pennsylvania government placed a £200 bounty on his head in 1756, and relinquished his position to Tamaqua. Soon after, the Lenape began negotiating with the Pennsylvania authorities. From 1756 through 1758, the leaders of the western Lenape, Netawatwees and Tamaqua, cooperated in seeking a resolution to the frontier conflict. By 1758 Tamaqua was being referred to as "King Beaver" and his name tended to head the list of Ohio Lenape leaders. From the summer of 1758 through 1762, Tamaqua appears most frequently as chief spokesman for the Ohio natives, and the prime movers behind peace initiatives were the Lenape associated with Tamaqua. Communications between Philadelphia and the Lenape began to go directly to Tamaqua, in spite of Teedyuscung's self-proclaimed status as official negotiator. In 1758, Christian Frederick Post spent most of his time at Tamaqua's home in Kuskusky, and both Tamaqua and Pisquetomen served as his hosts and protectors.

Tamaqua was sensitive to his sudden rise in influence, and in August, 1758, he made a point of complaining that peace negotiations were undermined by the advance of Forbes' army to Loyalhanna (to begin construction of Fort Ligonier), noting that "if you had brought the news of peace before your army had begun to march, it would have caused a great deal more good." Tamaqua was also anxious to obtain a guarantee that the English would prevent colonial settlers from moving into Lenape territory, a concern voiced by Pisquetomen when he asked two British soldiers who accompanied Christian Frederick Post, "...whether the General will claim the land as his own, when he should drive the French away."

== Participation at the Treaty of Easton conference, 1758 ==
At the Treaty of Easton conference in November, 1758, Tamaqua agreed to carry word of the treaty to the natives living beyond the Ohio, but asked that the English "after having drive away the French, not settle there." During the conference, Tamaqua objected to the request by Christian Frederick Post that they discuss the release of white prisoners held in Lenape communities: "it appears very odd and unreasonable that [you] should demand prisoners before there is an established peace; since an unreasonable demand makes us appear as if we wanted brains." After the conclusion of the war, he co-operated with Colonel Henry Bouquet in the return of white prisoners.

In the following months through the spring of 1759, Tamaqua worked to arrange councils, meeting with Kickapoos and Kaskaskias from the Illinois country as well as natives from throughout the Great Lakes to communicate the substance of the Easton Treaty and Bouquet's messages. In meetings with colonial authorities, Tamaqua served as principal native spokesman who would establish the agenda on behalf of other Native participants and often opened the proceedings. Tamaqua also promoted renewed trade, as the war had disrupted trade networks and the Lenape, like most other Native Americans east of the Mississippi, were now largely dependent on manufactured trade goods. At a meeting in February 1759, Tamaqua emphasized the importance of trade relations in establishing peace, and brought several of his own warriors "with their Skins and Furrs, in hopes that the Goods which you promised to send to trade with us are come." Traders such as James Kenney were soon sent with trade goods to revive the fur trade and reaffirm the good relationship between Philadelphia and the Lenape.

== Meetings with Hugh Mercer, 1759 ==
On 7 February 1759, Colonel Hugh Mercer received a report from a Mohican scout that he had observed "at the Salt Spring above Kaskaskias [Kuskuskies] a large number of [French] troops." Mercer then held an important council with the Delawares at Fort Pitt. At that time, Tamaqua was living at Saucunk (close to the site of present-day Pittsburgh). At this council on February 24, he announced that the Delawares wanted to move in order to avoid any fighting between the French and the British, stating, "The Six Nations and you desire that I would sit down and smoke my pipe at Kuskusky. I tell you this that you may think no ill of my removing from Saucunk to Kuskusky, for it is at the great desire of my brothers, the English, and my uncles, the Six Nations, and there I shall always hear your words." Mercer reportedly replied, "Your Brothers, the English, desire to see you live in Peace and Happiness, either at Saucunk, Kuskusky, or wherever you think proper, and by no means intend to Limit you to one Place or another."

In July and August 1759, George Croghan and Colonel Hugh Mercer held a council at the newly constructed Fort Pitt. The council included over 500 Natives, mostly Lenape, but also delegates from the Detroit Wyandots and the Ohio Haudenosaunee. Tamaqua, accompanied by Shingas, Keekyuscung, Nenatcheehunt, Guyasuta, Killbuck, and Captain Pipe, was the principal speaker on the native side. Speaking for both his own Lenape followers and their allies, he reaffirmed their commitment to peace. As the release of white captives held in Native communities was a major demand of the Pennsylvania authorities, Tamaqua took the initiative by releasing two female captives. To emphasize the difficulty of giving up captives who had been adopted into the tribe, Tamaqua referred to them as "my Mother" and "my Sister." Finally, Tamaqua asked the English to show their sincerity by keeping the Catawba (longtime enemies of the Ohio and Lakes) out of the Ohio country. An official peace was concluded on September 13, 1759.

== Role as negotiator after Pontiac's War ==
Relations between the Lenape and British troops occupying the Ohio country quickly deteriorated, as colonial settlers quickly began to occupy native hunting grounds and the widespread sale of alcohol led to drunken brawls, theft and hostility. In response, the British government authorized Commander-in-Chief Sir Jeffrey Amherst and to enact a new, restrictive trade policy that banned the sale and trading of alcohol to natives, and restricted such trade goods as muskets, powder, knives, tomahawks, razors—anything that could be used as weapons against British forces on the frontier. Lenape tensions were fueled by the 1763 Pontiac Rebellion, which unified the western nations into action. While Tamaqua and Shingas opposed the attacks against British forts and settlements in the Ohio, they could not persuade Lenape warriors to refrain from fighting. Lenape warriors, together with other western tribes, joined Ottawa leader Pontiac and Seneca leader Guyasuta and took control of ten out of the thirteen British forts they attacked and were particularly active in sieges against Fort Ligonier and Fort Pitt.

Following the defeat of combined Native American forces at the Battle of Bushy Run in August, 1763, Lenape warriors largely withdrew from the fighting. In November, 1764, Tamaqua and other leaders met with Colonel Bouquet at Fort Pitt. Tamaqua agreed to release over eighty captives held by the Lenape. Tamaqua told Bouquet he hoped the Lenape would "embrace Peace once more with their Brethren" and to "now think of nothing but hunting, to exchange their Skins and Furs with their brethren for Cloathing."

Tamaqua was recognized as one of the three Lenape leaders, together with Netawatwees and Custaloga. After Bouquet's military left the region in 1765, the three leaders called a western Lenape council meeting to discuss tribal concerns regarding a settlement with the British. Recognizing that trade would be crucial in improving relations, Tamaqua worked hard to reopen trading posts and revive the fur trade which had been disrupted by the two previous wars.

== Later life and death ==
As of 1761, Tamaqua was living in Tuscarawas. James Kenny, a Quaker frontiersman who was hired by Israel Pemberton Jr. to bring supplies to the Lenape and Shawnee in western Pennsylvania, describes him as "a steady, quiet, middle-aged man of a cheerfull disposition but low stature." He also reports that Tamaqua was drinking heavily. In 1761 Kenny wrote in his journal: "[I] receiv'd a Letter from Frederick Post dated ye 27th [July] at Tuscorawas Town, in which he informs me that...he was in fear some time ago when ye Beaver took Six Ceggs Rum there & they were Drunke Six Days." In September he writes that "[The] Beaver's family gets Rum at this place frequently & carries home by which ye Indians frequently get Drunk pawning their Clothes Wampum & all they have for it." In March, 1762, he writes: "The Beaver is returned & seems unwell & not so Cheerful as befor they went down, they seem half Snow'd with Rum."

Sources differ on the date of Tamaqua's death. One source states that he died in 1769 in Gekelemukpechunk, near present-day Newcomerstown, Ohio.

Christopher Gist states that "he died about 1770, on the Muskingum, where the Moravian town of Gnadenhutten was built about two years afterwards."

Another source claims:

As early as 1756, he established the town of Tuscarawas, on the river of the same name in Ohio, a town which was later known as King Beaver's Town. There he died in 1771, admonishing his people to accept Christianity. In the latter years of his life he had come under the influence of the Moravians."

He was succeeded as leader of the western Lenape by Netawatwees, who was formally recognized during a Lenape council meeting at Newcomerstown in May, 1772.

== Memorialization ==
A diorama depicting Tamaqua next to his canoe can be seen in the 18th century frontier exhibit at the Fort Pitt Museum.

A plaque commemorating a 1758 treaty concluded at Kuskusky by Christian Frederick Post and King Beaver (Tamaqua) was erected in 1925 at Slippery Rock, Pennsylvania, by the Historical Society of Slippery Rock. The plaque refers to the treaty, mandating the retreat of the Lenape Indians from Fort Duquesne, as "the most important treaty ever concluded with the North American Indians [which] made possible the winning of the French and Indian War."

== See also ==
- Pisquetomen
- Shingas
- Sassoonan
- Christian Frederick Post
- Lenape people
