= Hugh Gibson (American pioneer) =

American pioneer (1741–1826)

- Born: 1741; Lancaster County, Pennsylvania
- Died: 30 July 1826 (aged 84–85); Wayne Township, Crawford County, Pennsylvania, U.S.
- Known for: Captivity by Native Americans and escape
- Parent(s): David Gibson and Mary McClelland
- Relatives: Israel (brother), Mary (sister)

Hugh Gibson (1741 - 30 July 1826) (referred to by Marie Le Roy and Barbara Leninger as "Owen Gibson") was an American pioneer and a Pennsylvania frontiersman. In 1756, when he was 14 years old, his farm was attacked by warriors of the indigenous Lenape nation and he was taken prisoner. He was adopted as a brother by Pisquetomen, a Lenape chief, and lived for three years with the Lenape, moving to several different communities. In 1759 he escaped, together with three other captives.

Gibson told a brief, first-person version of his captivity narrative to Archibald Loudoun, who published it in 1811. At age 85, he told a longer version of his story to Timothy Alden, who published it in 1837, after Gibson's death.

== Birth and early life ==
Hugh Gibson was born in 1741 in Lancaster County, Pennsylvania. His father, David Gibson, came from Sixmilecross in County Tyrone, Northern Ireland, in 1740. His mother's name was Mary McClelland. They bought land near Peach Bottom Ferry on the Susquehanna River in Lancaster County. David Gibson died when Hugh was an infant, and his mother took Hugh, his sister Mary, and his brother Israel to live with her brother William McClelland outside Robinson's Fort, in "Shearman's Valley," now known as Shermans Dale, Pennsylvania.

== Captivity ==
Hugh Gibson was captured in July, 1756 by Delaware Indians. In his first-person account published in 1811, he states that he was living at the time outside Robinson's Fort, "twenty miles above Carlisle," near present-day Southwest Madison Township, Pennsylvania. Due to recent attacks by Indians, most of the local population had taken refuge inside the fort, but Gibson, his mother, and Elizabeth Henry, a neighbor, were outside the fort looking for lost cattle when they were attacked by the Indians. Gibson's mother was killed and he was taken captive by "a son of King Beaver." Elizabeth Henry was also captured, but the two were separated and Gibson never saw her again.

=== Adoption by Pisquetomen, 1756 ===
Gibson was brought to Kittanning, where he was adopted as a brother by Pisquetomen (whom Gibson refers to as "Bisquittam" or "Busqueetam"), and named "Munhuttakiswilluxissohpon," which was the name of a deceased brother of Pisquetomen and was translated to Gibson as "Big-rope-gut-hominy." Gibson was taken to the river to "wash away all his White blood, and make him an Indian." He was then painted and given Indian clothes. Gibson reports that Pisquetomen spoke and understood English well.

=== Raid on Kittanning ===
Gibson and Pisquetomen were living in Kittanning on 8 September 1756, when it was attacked by Colonel John Armstrong's forces, and Gibson asked Pisquetomen what he should do. Pisquetomen told him to stay with the women, where he was guarded with several other white captives, including Simon Girty, Marie Le Roy and Barbara Leininger. After the attack, he was forced to witness the torture of a woman who had attempted to escape with Armstrong's men, and observed that one of the Indians was wearing his mother's scalp, "which hung as a trophy from his belt." Gibson was told that he had to witness the torture "to show him how they would deal with him, in case he should ever attempt to run away."

=== Visits to Saucunk and Kuskusky, 1757-58 ===
After the attack, Gibson was then taken to Fort Duquesne, and later to "Kuskuskin [Hog-Town] on the Mahoning." While there, Gibson one day remarked that "he had heard that the white people were coming against the Indians," which was overheard by Pisquetomen's brother and his wife, who said they would see Gibson burnt alive as soon as Pisquetomen returned from a visit to Shenango. Rather than have him killed, Pisquetomen instead took Gibson to live with him in a tent outside Kuskusky, although this may have been an effort to avoid further conflict with Pisquetomen's brother. Gibson says that, by this time, he was "acquainted with their manners and customs, had learned their language, and was become a tolerable good hunter, was admitted to their dances, to their sacrifices, and religious ceremonies."

In the spring of 1757 Gibson and Pisquetomen moved to Saucunk where they lived for a year. Gibson says that at this time, Pisquetomen "took a Dutch captive for his wife." Although Gibson was theoretically Pisquetomen's adoptive brother, he lived much like a slave and was frequently threatened and abused. When Gibson refused an offer of marriage to a Lenape woman, Pisquetomen beat him with a hickory rod. On another occasion, Pisquetomen accused Gibson of being lazy, knocked him to the ground and trampled him underfoot. Gibson shamed Pisquetomen by calling him "brother," and meekly accepting the punishment. Remorseful, Pisquetomen treated Gibson kindly after this.

Gibson became good friends with another white captive, Hezekiah Wright, who wanted Gibson to escape with him, offering him forty dollars and promising to teach Gibson "the millwright's trade." In the fall of 1757 the two stole a horse, intending to cross the Ohio River, but Wright regretted the decision, afraid of being tortured if the Indians caught them. They then returned to the village before their escape had been discovered. Pisquetomen had noted that Gibson and Wright were frequently together, and accused Gibson of planning to escape. He then ordered him burned alive, and several men beat Gibson and gathered wood for a fire. Gibson then apologized, telling Pisquetomen that he and Wright had been planning to build a plough, with which they hoped to cultivate cornfields. Pisquetomen was appeased by this and ordered him released.

In late 1758, Gibson and Pisquetomen returned to Kuskusky, where the Lenape were preparing to go to war at Tulpehocken. Gibson volunteered to join the war party, thinking that it might offer him a chance to escape, but Pisquetomen would not permit him to go. Another warrior told Gibson "that he only wished to go to the war in order to have an opportunity to desert from the Indians." One of Pisquetomen's brothers, Buffalo Horn, promised to allow Gibson to accompany him to fight the Cherokees the following year, and employed Gibson as a servant in the meantime, sending him to Fort McIntosh in the company of a Black slave. (Note: In Timothy Alden's version of his story, Gibson makes three references to visiting Fort McIntosh in 1758, however Fort McIntosh was not built until 1778.) In spite of fears and accusations that Gibson was planning to escape, he was sent alone, on foot, to deliver a message from Shingas to Kuskusky, a 36-mile journey.

Gibson later accompanied a group of warriors to Fort McIntosh, but they kept a close eye on him and he was unable to escape. Pisquetomen had warned them that if they allowed Gibson to escape, "he would make them pay him a thousand bucks, or return him another prisoner equally good."

Gibson reports that on one occasion, he went hunting with Shingas and killed a bear, which embarrassed Shingas, who failed to kill anything. Shingas treated Gibson with respect, however. Shingas hailed Gibson as a prophet when Gibson predicted a peace treaty between the Pennsylvania government and the Lenape, saying that he had dreamed about it, and a few days later Christian Frederick Post arrived to discuss such a treaty.

== Escape, 1759 ==
In October 1758, after French and Indian forces were defeated in an attack on the British outpost of Fort Ligonier, Pisquetomen and Gibson moved to Muskingum. There, Gibson met Marie Le Roy and Barbara Leininger, two girls about 15 years of age, from Switzerland and Germany respectively, who had been captured during the Penn's Creek Massacre on 16 October 1755, and whom he had known at Kittanning and Kuskusky. He also met David Brackenridge, a 21-year-old wagon-driver from Scotland who had been captured during the assault on Loyalhanna on 12 October 1758.

In March 1759, Le Roy (referred to by the family name of Grove in Gibson's narrative) was informed that she was to marry a Lenape man. She told Gibson that "she would sooner be shot than have him for her husband," and she and Leininger begged Gibson to escape with them. Leininger pretended to be ill (or possibly menstruating). They may have been exploiting the Lenape practice of requiring sick persons to live outside the community, as a form of quarantine to prevent the spread of contagious disease, or traditions related to the seclusion of girls at puberty, when Lenape custom required them to stay isolated in a menstruation hut. Le Roy volunteered to stay with her and care for her in a small camp about seven miles from the village. Gibson then asked Pisquetomen if he could go in search of Pisquetomen's horse, which had wandered off, and Pisquetomen agreed to allow Gibson to go after the horse. Gibson proposed that he also be allowed to do some hunting, and Pisquetomen provided Gibson with a rifle, powder and shot, as well as blankets and shirts and a deerskin for making moccasins. Pisquetomen mentioned that he planned to dig up hoppenies (peanuts) near Le Roy and Leininger's camp.

The next day (16 March 1759), Gibson went to the girls' camp, where he also met David Brackenridge, and at sunset the four of them set out, passing close to the spot where Pisquetomen had been digging peanuts. (Note: In Gibson's first-person narrative published by Archibald Loudoun in 1811, he does not mention Le Roy, Leininger or Brackenridge, but describes his escape as though he had gone alone.) They saw other Indians from the village, and passed close to several homes, but were not seen, and crossed the Muskingum River. They headed south to confuse anyone following their trail, then veered east the next day, traveling over a hundred miles in the first four days to reach the Ohio River. On the 250-mile journey to Fort Pitt, Leininger nearly drowned crossing Little Beaver Creek, Gibson was wounded by a bear he had shot, they ran out of provisions and Le Roy nearly drowned in the Ohio River. While crossing a river on a hastily constructed raft, Gibson lost his rifle as well as his flint and steel, leaving them to spend the last four nights of their journey sleeping in the snow with no fire.

After fifteen days, all four made it to Fort Pitt safely on 31 March. Soldiers at the fort were suspicious, as the four were dressed in Indian clothing, and asked them to provide evidence that they had been captured. Gibson mentioned the name of his brother Israel, who was known to some of the soldiers, and they were permitted to enter the fort.

== Aftermath ==
In May, Le Roy and Leininger were taken to Philadelphia. David Brackenridge returned to his home in Chester County, Pennsylvania only to find that his family had believed him dead and all his belongings had been auctioned off, however the buyers gladly returned them when they learned that he was alive.

Gibson was sent to live with his uncle William McClelland and his sister Mary in Tyrone Township, Perry County, Pennsylvania. On 14 June 1762, he married Mary White and returned to his mother's farm near the place outside Robinson's fort where he had been captured, but moved to Lancaster County in 1763 after hearing that the Lenape were planning to capture him again. In 1794 he moved to Plum Creek near present-day Verona, Pennsylvania, and in 1797 to Wayne Township, Crawford County, Pennsylvania. He died there on 30 July 1826.

== Sources ==
Gibson dictated his story to Archibald Loudoun, a childhood friend, who published it in 1811 in A Selection of Some of the Most Interesting Narratives, of Outrages, Committed by the Indians, in Their Wars with the White People. At age 85, he told his story to Timothy Alden, who published it in 1837, after Gibson's death. Gibson is referred to as "Owen Gibson" in Marie Le Roy and Barbara Leininger's account of their captivity and escape, The Narrative of Marie Le Roy and Barbara Leininger, for Three Years Captives Among the Indians, published in 1759.

== See also ==
- Pisquetomen
- Kittanning (village)
- Kuskusky
- Muskingum (village)
- Saucunk
- Penn's Creek Massacre
- Captivity narrative
