= Saucunk =

- Historic Native American village
- Etymology: Unami: pasakunk "at the mouth or fork of a stream."
- Former location of Saucunk, present-day site of Rochester, Pennsylvania

- Former location of Saucunk in Pennsylvania Saucunk (the United States)
- Coordinates: 40°42′11″N 80°17′0″W
- State: Pennsylvania
- Present-day Community: Rochester, Pennsylvania
- Founded: about 1725
- Abandoned: August, 1763

Population
  - Estimate (1758): 300−400

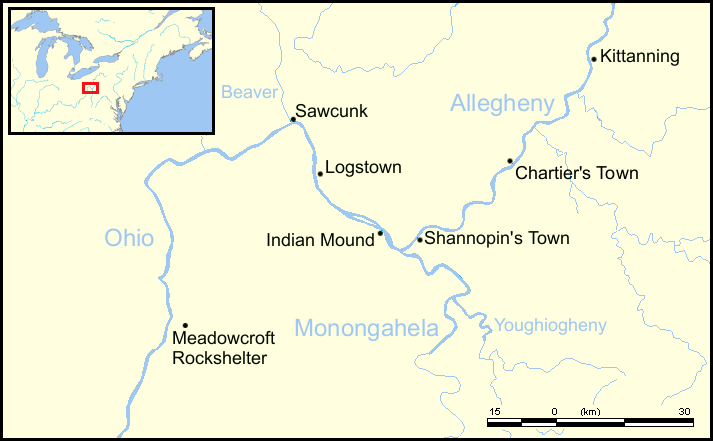
Sawcunk and other Native American villages, most circa 1750s

Saucunk or Sawcunk (also known as Soh-kon, Sacung, Sankonk, Sackum, or Shingas' Town) was a town established by the Lenape and Shawnees. It was the site of a Catholic mission and was visited by Conrad Weiser, Christian Frederick Post and George Croghan. The Lenape chiefs Tamaqua, Pisquetomen, Captain Jacobs and Shingas all lived there temporarily. Saucunk was abandoned after the Battle of Bushy Run in 1763.

== Etymology ==
The name "Saucunk" is a corruption of the Lenape "pasakunk", meaning "at the mouth or fork of a stream."

== Establishment, 1725 ==
Saucunk was established at the mouth of the Beaver Creek by the Lenape and Shawnees, possibly as early as 1725, during their westward migration. The settlement extended to the bluff above the Ohio about a mile below the mouth of the Beaver. It was near the site of present-day Rochester, Pennsylvania. The town was for many years the main community of the Turtle Division of the Lenape.

== Visit by Conrad Weiser, 1748 ==
Conrad Weiser went to Saucunk when on his mission to the Western Indians in 1748. He says in his Journal under date of August 30: "I went to Beaver Creek, an Indian Town, about 8 miles off (from Logstown), chiefly Delawares, the rest Mohocks, to have some belts of wampum made...We both (Weiser and Andrew Montour) lodged at this town at George Croghan's trading house."

== French and Indian War ==
In 1755 Saucunk was used as a staging area by Captain Jacobs and Shingas for raids on British colonial settlements. After the destruction of Kittanning in August, 1756, Shingas and his brother Pisquetomen lived at Saucunk until 1759, when the ongoing French and Indian War led them to move to Kuskusky. During this time, the community was often referred to as Shingas' Town.

== Captives ==
Marie Le Roy and Barbara Leininger, both age 12, were captured during the Penn's Creek massacre on 16 October 1755. In her account of her captivity, Marie Le Roy reports that in November, 1756 she and Barbara Leininger "accompanied our Indian master to Sackum [Saucunk], where we spent the winter, keeping house for the savages, who were continually on the hunt."

Hugh Gibson, 14, was captured in July, 1756, by Lenape Indians, outside Robinson's Fort, near present-day Southwest Madison Township, Pennsylvania. His mother and a neighbor were killed by the Indians, and he was brought to Kittanning, where he was adopted by Shingas' brother Pisquetomen. In the spring of 1757 Gibson and Pisquetomen moved to "Soh’-koon, at the mouth of the Big Beaver," where they lived together with Pisquetomen's Dutch wife for a year, then moved to Muskingum. In March, 1759, Gibson escaped, together with Marie Le Roy and Barbara Leininger and a Scotsman named David Brackenridge, and walked 250 miles to Fort Pitt (then under construction).

Marie Le Roy states that in October 1758, after French and Indian forces were defeated in an attack on the British outpost of Fort Ligonier, most of the population of the Kuskusky towns, Logstown and Saucunk fled to Muskingum. John McCullough was 8 years old when he was captured by Lenape warriors in July, 1756, and brought to "Shenango," (a corruption of Chiningué). In his captivity narrative he reports living there with a Lenape family for two and a half years before moving to "Kseek-he-ooing" (possibly Saucunk) in late 1758. In December, 1764, McCullough was released along with over 200 other captives by order of Colonel Henry Bouquet.

== Catholic mission, 1757 ==
In July, 1757, Jesuit Father Claude Francis Virot founded a Catholic mission at Saucunk, and was joined for a brief period by Father Pierre Joseph Antonie Rouboud. The Lenape Chief Pakanke, known for his dislike of missionaries, reportedly became jealous of Virot's influence over the community, however, and the Jesuit was forced to leave after Fort Duquesne was captured by the British in November, 1758. Virot is known as the only Jesuit who ever attempted to found a mission on the upper Ohio River.

== Visit by Christian Frederick Post, 1758 ==
Moravian missionary Christian Frederick Post visited Saucunk in the summer and autumn of 1758. He found the people there hostile towards him, as they believed that the British were planning to take control of Lenape territory. Post writes:

We set out from Kushkushkee for Sankonk. My Company consisted of 25 Horsemen and 15 Foot. We arrived at Sankonk in the Afternoon. The People of the Town were much disturbed at my coming, and received me in a very rough Manner. They surrounded me with drawn Knives in their Hands, in such a Manner that I could hardly get along; running up against me with their Breasts open, as if they wanted some Pretence to kill me. I saw by their Countenances they sought my Death. Their Faces were quite distorted with Rage, and they went so far as to say I should not live long.

Post then met with White Eyes and Gelelemend, the two principal war captains of the Turtle tribe at Saukunk, who had once been very hostile to Post's peace negotiations, but who now "received me very kindly" and "apologized for their former rude behaviour." The two warriors then escorted Post back to Kuskusky for a Grand Council meeting.

== Visit by George Croghan, 1758 ==
The French burned and abandoned Fort Duquesne on 26 November and British forces led by John Forbes occupied it the next day. On 27 November, George Croghan and Andrew Montour crossed the Allegheny River and reached Saucunk on the 29th, where they were joined by Christian Frederick Post and Lieutenant John Hays. Croghan's journal states that, "at Beaver Creek [Saucunk] there is thirty-eight houses, all built by the French for the Indians, some with stone chimneys. When all their men is at home they can Send out One Hundred Warriors."

== Meeting with Mercer, 1759 ==
1755 map by John Mitchell showing "Shingoes T.," just left of map's center.

On 7 February 1759, Colonel Hugh Mercer received a report from a Mohican scout that he had observed "at the Salt Spring above Kaskaskias Kuskusky a large number of [French] troops." Mercer then held an important council with the Delawares at Fort Pitt.

At that time, Tamaqua (also known as King Beaver) was living at Saucunk. At this council on February 24, he announced that the Delawares wanted to move in order to avoid any fighting between the French and the British, stating, "The Six Nations and you desire that I would sit down and smoke my pipe at Kuskusky. I tell you this that you may think no ill of my removing from Saucunk to Kuskusky, for it is at the great desire of my brothers, the English, and my uncles, the Six Nations, and there I shall always hear your words."

Mercer reportedly replied, "Your Brothers, the English, desire to see you live in Peace and Happiness, either at Saucunk, Kuskusky, or wherever you think proper, and by no means intend to Limit you to one Place or another." In the spring of 1759, the Delawares moved from Saucunk and Kuskuskee to communities on the Muskingum River and the Scioto River in Ohio.

== Abandonment, 1763 ==
The town was deserted after the Battle of Bushy Run, August 5 and 6, 1763. When Colonel Henry Bouquet's expedition passed through the place in the autumn of 1764 on its way to the Tuscarawas, the chimneys of the houses which the French had built for the Indians were still standing. In his journal, Bouquet wrote:

"October 6: Big Beaver Creek...runs through a rich vale, with a pretty strong current, its banks high, the upland adjoining it very good, the timber tall and young. About a mile below [Beaver Creek's] confluence with the Ohio stood formerly a large town, on a steep bank, built by the French, of square logs, with stone chimneys, for some of the Shawanese, Delawares and Mingo Tribes, who abandoned it in the year 1758, when the French deserted Fort Du Quesne. Near the fording of Beaver Creek stood about seven houses, which were deserted and destroyed by the Indians after their defeat at Bushy Run (August 6, 1763) when they forsook all their remaining settlements in this part of the country."

== Fort McIntosh ==
In 1778, British general Lachlan McIntosh ordered Fort McIntosh to be constructed at the site of the village. The fort became the headquarters for the Department of the West. The construction of the fort likely destroyed any evidence of the occupation of the historic Native Americans at this location.

== See also ==
- Logstown
- Kuskusky
- Kittanning (village)
- Shannopin's Town
- Shamokin (village)
