= Muskingum (village) =

Muskingum or Conchake Wyandot: Darekwa or Darihkwe Unami: msh-kik-wam or koshaxkink
- Historic Native American village
- Etymology: Unami: msh-kik-wam "swampy ground" or Unami: koshaxkink "river crossing"
- Former location of Muskingum in Ohio Muskingum (the United States)
- Coordinates: 40°16′4″N 81°51′24″W
- State: Ohio
- Present-day Community: Coshocton, Ohio
- Founded: 1748
- Abandoned: 1759

Population
  - Estimate (1750): 300−400

Muskingum (Wyandot: Darekwa or Darihkwe, also known as Conchake) was a Wyandot village in southeastern Ohio from 1747 to 1755. It was an important trade center in the early 1750s, until it was devastated by smallpox in the winter of 1752. The town was repopulated for a short time afterwards, then abandoned again as a new community was established by Netawatwees a few miles to the east at Gekelukpechink. The city of Coshocton, Ohio was founded close to the site of the village in 1802.

== Etymology ==
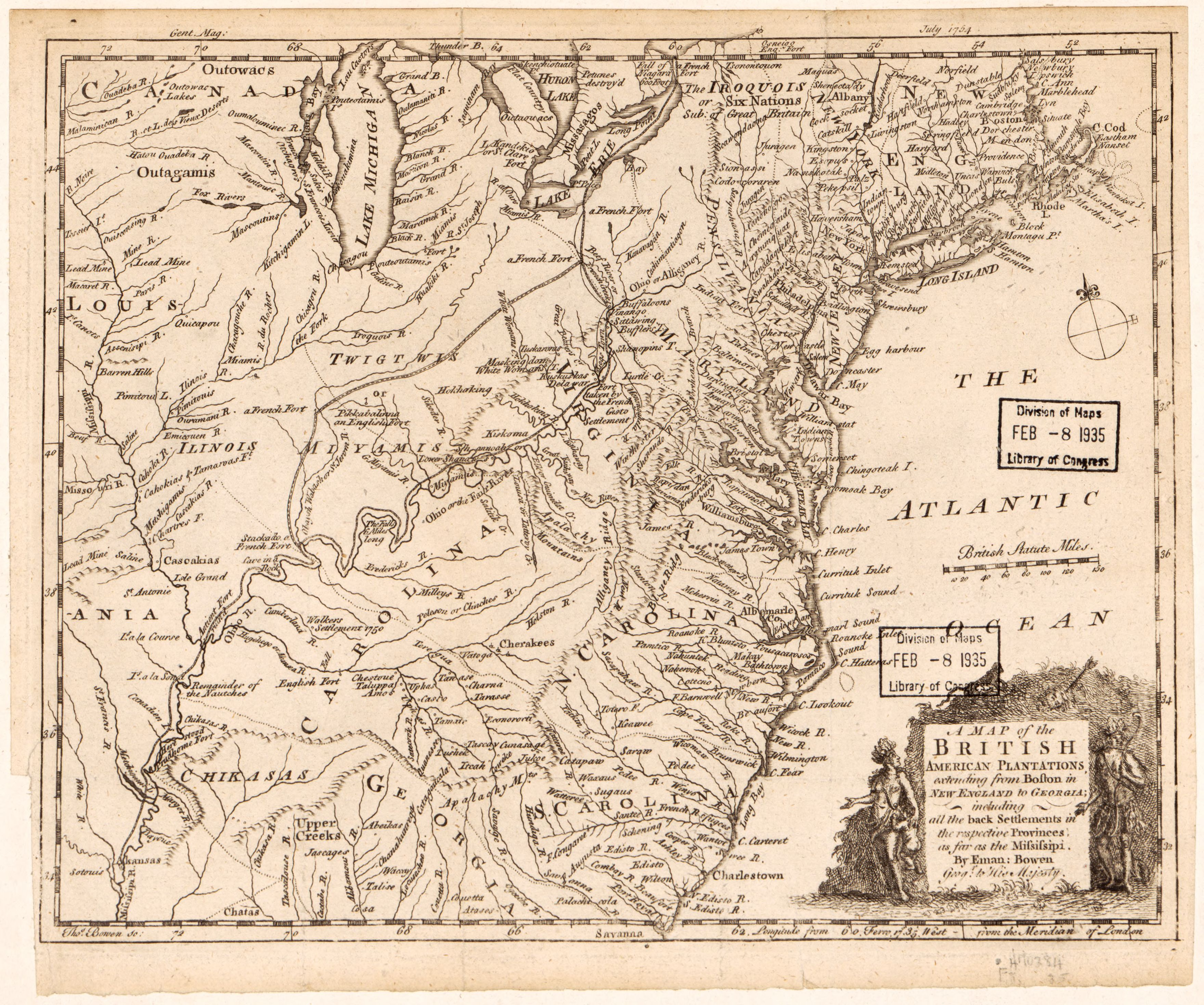
1754 map of British plantations in North America, showing "Maskingdom," just above the center of the map.

The name Muskingum may come from the Shawnee word mshkikwam 'swampy ground'. The name may also be from Lenape "Mach kawënshàk," referring to thorns, or a specific species of thorn bush. Muskingum has also been taken to mean 'elk's eye' (mus wəshkinkw) by folk etymology, as in mus 'elk' + wəshkinkw 'its eye'. Moravian missionary David Zeisberger wrote that the Muskingum River was called Elk's Eye "because of the numbers of elk that formerly fed on its banks."

John McCullough, a captive who lived in Muskingum briefly during 1763, says in his captivity narrative that the name "Moosh-king-oong...signifies 'clear eyes,' as the river abounds with a certain kind of fish that have very clear eyes."

Conchake, (Cong-sha-keh), another name for the town, has been preserved in the name of the town of Coshocton, Ohio, and comes from Lenape Koshaxkink, 'where there is a river crossing.' The word also refers to a location or river of refuge, or a road or path to refuge. The name was given in 1748 when a large band of Wyandot moved to the Muskingum River area to escape conflict with the French.

== Establishment, 1748 ==
Muskingum was built by Wyandots who arrived with Orontony in the spring of 1748. In April, 1748 Orontony and 119 Wyandot warriors, together with Miami Indian warriors led by Memeskia, attacked and burned the French Fort St. Philippe (Fort Miami). Orontony then abandoned his community of Junundat and set off for the Ohio valley. About 70 of the warriors and their families settled at Muskingum. The remainder went farther east to build a new town at Kuskusky.

== Visit by Christopher Gist, 1750 ==
The town was visited by Christopher Gist on December 14, 1750, he wrote in his Journal:

Friday, 13th.--Set out W 5 m. to Muskingum, a town of the Wyendotts. The Land upon Elk's Eye Creek is in general very broken, the Bottoms narrow. The Wyendotts, or "Little Mingoes," are divided between the French and English, one-half of them adhere to the first, and the other half are firmly attached to the latter. The Town of Muskingum consists of about one hundred families. When we came within sight of the Town, we perceived English colours hoisted on the King's House, and at George Croghan's [trading house]; upon enquiring the reason, I was informed that the French had lately taken several English Traders, and that Mr.Croghan had ordered all the white men to come into this Town, and had sent expresses to the Traders of the lower Towns, and among the Pickweylinees; and the Indians had sent to their people to come to Council about it.

Gist learned from George Croghan and Andrew Montour that two of Croghan's men had been captured by the French along with horses and the skins they were carrying to Philadelphia to be sold. On Christmas, Gist asked Montour and a blacksmith named Thomas Burney (employed by Croghan) to bring some of the Indians to hear him read the Bible. Afterwards, the Indians thanked Gist and invited him to live permanently at Muskingum, giving him the Wyandot name of Annosanah, "the Name of a very Good man that had formerly lived among them." Gist said that he was worried about being captured by the French, to which the Indians invited him to "bring great Guns and make a Fort" at Muskingum. The Indians wanted him to baptize their children and perform Christian weddings but Gist told them they would need a minister to come and instruct them properly.

It is possible that the Indians were less interested in Christianity than in having an English fort equipped with artillery in the town, as attacks by French-allied Indians were becoming more frequent.

The following day, Gist witnessed the execution of a woman prisoner who had tried to escape. She was beaten and shot through the heart with an arrow, then scalped and beheaded. Barney Curran, the trader in charge of Croghan's trading post, asked to be allowed to bury the body.

On 9 December two traders arrived in the town, bringing the news "that another English Trader was taken Prisoner by the French, and that three French soldiers had deserted and come over to the English side and surrendered themselves to some of the Traders of the Pick Town, and that the Indians would have put them to death, to Revenge their Taking out Traders, but as the French Prisoners had surrendered themselves, the English would not let the Indians hurt them, but had them ordered to be sent under the care of three of our Traders and delivered at this Town to George Croghan."

== Commerce with English traders ==
1755 map by John Mitchell showing "Muskingum, English Facty. (factory) T. of Owendoes," lower left of map's center.

Before 1750, George Croghan established a trading house at Muskingum, complete with a residence and a storehouse called "the King's House." Croghan was there when Christopher Gist arrived in December, 1750. The trading house was seized by the French in 1753 or 1754, and the goods stored there were confiscated. In the account of losses suffered by George Croghan & Co. dated at Carlisle, Pennsylvania April 24, 1756, appears the item: "one store-house at Muskingum, £150."

In 1752 William Trent visited Muskingum on his way to Pickawillany. He states in his Journal, under date of June 29, 1752: "We got to Muskingum, 150 miles from the Logstown, where we met some white men from Hockhocken who told us the town was taken and all the white men killed." Trent was referring to Pickawillany, which had been burned by French-allied Indians on 21 June 1752.

== Abandonment, 1755 ==
Smallpox ravaged many communities in the Ohio Country in 1752–1753. By the time Gaspard-Joseph Chaussegros de Léry visited "Conchake" on 29 March 1755, it was nearly empty. He describes Muskingum as "a place where the Hurons [Wyandots] took refuge during the war [1747-48]; 120 of them died in one summer. One can still see the graves and the vestiges of the village that stood there then. At present there are only two cabins, one of which is occupied by a Christian savage from Sault St. Louis (Kahnawake) who has been there a long while. The other belongs to the Five Nations."

Captive Charles Stuart passed through the area on 23 November 1755 and noticed Croghan's residence and trading house still standing. In his captivity narrative, he wrote:

"We Continued Travelling near the river for abt 10 Miles thro' Land Cover'd with the ground Oaks of Barrens But yet the Soil Seem'd pretty good--the said barrens...ended at the House where an Eng[lish] Indian Trader had Formerly Lived and where was an Indian House, Both of which were deserted."

A few Lenape refugees from Kittanning, including Shingas and his brother Pisquetomen, moved to Muskingum after Kittanning was destroyed by Colonel John Armstrong on 8 September 1756. By 1758 they had moved to Kuskusky.

== Captives ==
By 1758, the town was repopulated and was home to several English captives taken in raids on frontier communities during the French and Indian War.

Marie Le Roy and Barbara Leininger, both age 12, were captured during the Penn's Creek massacre on 16 October 1755. They were taken to Punxsutawney, Pennsylvania, then to Kittanning, where they lived until Armstrong's attack in September 1756. After Kittanning was destroyed, the Indians moved for a time to Fort Duquesne. On 12 October 1758, French and Indian forces from nearby Fort Duquesne were defeated in an attack on the British outpost of Fort Ligonier, and the population of the Kuskusky towns fled, taking the girls to Muskingum. They escaped with Hugh Gibson in March 1759.

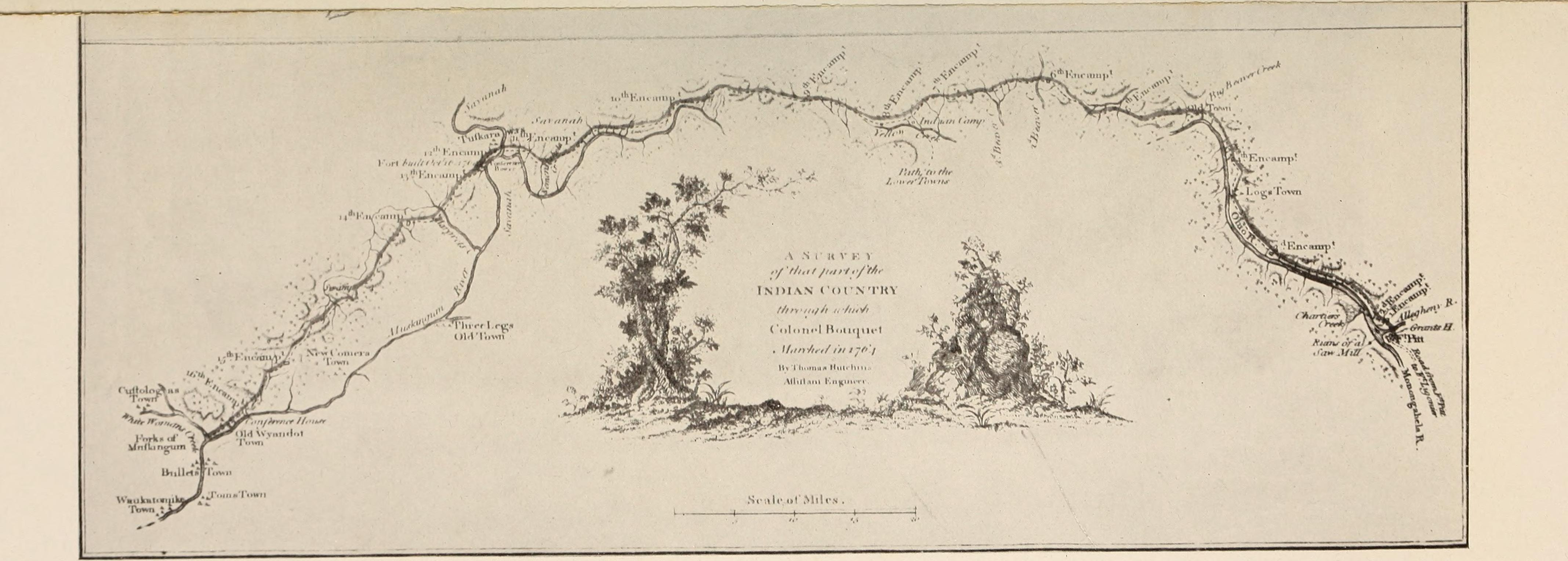
1764 map by Thomas Hutchins of Henry Bouquet's expedition showing "Old Wyandot Town" on the Ohio, just above the Forks of Muskingum, seen on the lower left side of the page.

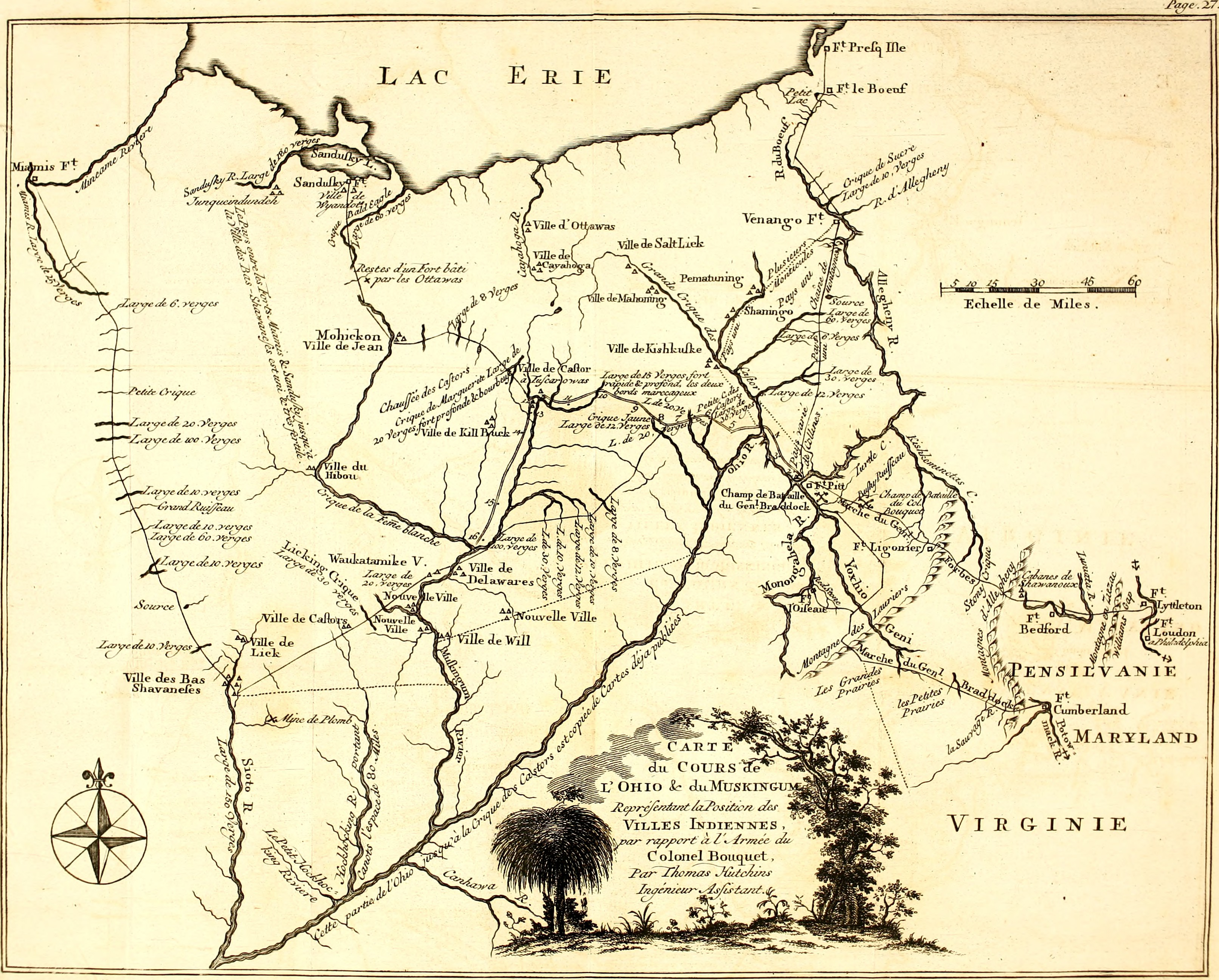
1769 French map of Native American villages in the Ohio Country. Muskingum ("Ville de Delawares") is in the lower left quadrant.

Hugh Gibson, 14, was captured in July, 1756 by Lenape Indians, outside Robinson's Fort, near present-day Southwest Madison Township, Pennsylvania. His mother and a neighbor were killed by the Indians, and he was brought to Kittanning, where he was adopted by Lenape war chief Pisquetomen. After Kittanning was attacked on 8 September 1756, Pisquetomen took him to Saucunk and then to Muskingum, where in March, 1759, he escaped, together with a Scotsman named David Brackenridge, Marie Le Roy, and Barbara Leininger. They walked 250 miles to Fort Pitt (then under construction).

John McCullough was 8 years old when he was captured by Lenape warriors in July, 1756, and brought to "Shenango," (a corruption of Chiningué). In his captivity narrative he reports living there with a Lenape family for two and a half years before moving to "Kseek-he-ooing" (possibly Saucunk) in late 1758. In 1763, McCullough was taken to "Moosh-king-oong" (Muskingum), which he reports, "signifies 'clear eyes,' as the river abounds with a certain kind of fish that have very clear eyes." In December, 1764, McCullough was released along with over 200 other captives by order of Colonel Henry Bouquet.

== Later history ==
On 15 March 1764 Colonel Henry Bouquet's army camped at the abandoned site of the village to receive captives handed over by Indians as part of a peace agreement signed the previous October with the Shawnee, the Ohio Seneca-Cayuga, and the Lenape. The Indians handed over about 260 captives.

A village was established a few miles east of the site of Muskingum in the 1760s by Netawatwees (c. 1686–1776), also known as Newcomer. Newcomer migrated to the area from Cuyahoga Falls with his band of Lenape Indians. The Lenape name of the town was "Gekelukpechink," (also spelled Gekelemukpechunk or Kecalamukpechink) meaning "still water." The town was used as a meeting place for the Iroquois Great Council, and English and American traders called it Newcomer's town, later Newcomerstown, Ohio. By 1771, more than one hundred dwellings had been built, and the town was the site of the Great Council Fire of the Lenape people. David McClure, Congregational preacher, visited the town in September, 1772 and provided a detailed description of the town and the surrounding countryside:

This town is called New Comers town by the English, & stands on the West bank of the Muskingum, 1 containing about 60 houses, some of logs, & others the bark of trees, fastened by elm bark to poles stuck in the ground & bent over at the top. There are nearly 100 families. It is the principal town of the Delaware nation, & the residence of the king & the greater part of the Councillors. There are several small villages up & down the river. This place is about 60 Miles above the mouth of the Muskingum. Eight or ten acres around the town, are cleared. On the opposite side of the River is a large corn field, in rich low ground; it is inclosed within one common fence, & each family has its division to plant. Some of the houses are well built, with hewed logs, with stone chimnies, chambers & sellers. These I was told were built by the English captives, in the time of the French wars.The king, whose name is Nettautwaleman, received me with hospitality. He is an old man, tall & active. His house is the largest, & built of small square logs. Around the walls, for beds & seats, were planks raised from the ground & covered with the hides of Buffaloes & Bears. Tuesday, afternoon, a messenger...conducted me to the Council House. It was a long building covered with hemlock bark, with a swinging door at each end...the Conjuror's house...was the best built in town except the king's. A cellar with stone wall — a stair case, a convenient stone chimney & fire place & closets & apartments, gave it the appearance of an English dwelling. Between the house & the bank of the River was a regular & thrifty peach orchard...The Muskingum is a beautiful country. The soil is rich and deep. The land gradually rises from the river & forms extensive meadows and plains. Some places are covered with luxuriant grass, & neither tree or bush growing upon them for some miles.

In 1776, more than seven hundred Lenape and several traders lived in the town. Gekelukpechink was destroyed on April 20, 1781 during Brodhead's Coshocton expedition, in retribution for Delaware raids against settlers.

The town of Tuscarawas, named after the river, was laid out by American colonists in 1802. The town was renamed Coshocton when it was designated county seat by the legislature in 1811.

== See also ==
- Kittanning (village)
- Orontony
- Pickawillany
- Lower Shawneetown
