= Israel Pemberton Jr. =

English-American merchant

Israel Pemberton

Member of the Pennsylvania General Assembly

Personal details
- Born: 1715
- Died: 1779 (aged 63–64); Philadelphia, Pennsylvania, United States
- Occupation: Merchant, politician, abolitionist

Israel Pemberton Jr. (1715–1779) was an English-American merchant and founding manager of the Pennsylvania Hospital.

== Biography ==
A grandson of a Quaker settler who migrated to the New World with William Penn in 1682, Pemberton profited from trade during King George's War. He ultimately was involved with funding Quaker schools and was a prominent proponent of Indian diplomacy, especially during the Seven Years' War. Notably, he funded Philadelphia's first fire company. In 1750, he was elected to the Pennsylvania Assembly.

In the mid-1770s, Pemberton and Thomas Harrison, a Quaker tailor, filed a lawsuit on behalf of Dinah Nevill, a woman of African and Native American descent, who had been brought to Pennsylvania as a slave from Virginia and who sought her and her three children's freedom under a Pennsylvania law prohibiting the enslavement of Indians. Nevill lost the court case, but Harrison stepped in to purchase her and her children and manumit them in 1781.

Pemberton was a member of the revived American Philosophical Society, elected in 1768.

== Death ==
Pemberton died in Philadelphia in 1779.
