= Fort Robinson (Pennsylvania) =

18th century fort in Pennsylvania, United States

- Perry County, Pennsylvania, USA

Site information
- Type: Fort
- Controlled by: Privately owned land

Location
- Approximate location of Fort Robinson in Pennsylvania
- Coordinates: 40°22.028′N 77°23.411′W

Site history
- Built: 1755
- In use: 1755-1764
- Battles/wars: French and Indian War, Pontiac's War

Garrison information
- Past commanders: George Robinson
- Garrison: up to 40 men, local settlers

Pennsylvania Historical Marker
- Designated: 1947

Fort Robinson (often spelled Robison or Robeson and frequently referred to in contemporary documents as George Robinson's Fort or simply Robinson's Fort) was a stockaded blockhouse fort built in 1755 in the colonial Province of Pennsylvania for the security of settlers moving into the area following the Albany Congress. The fort was constructed in "Shearman's Valley," now known as Shermans Dale, Pennsylvania, near present-day Northeast Madison Township, Pennsylvania.

== Location and construction ==
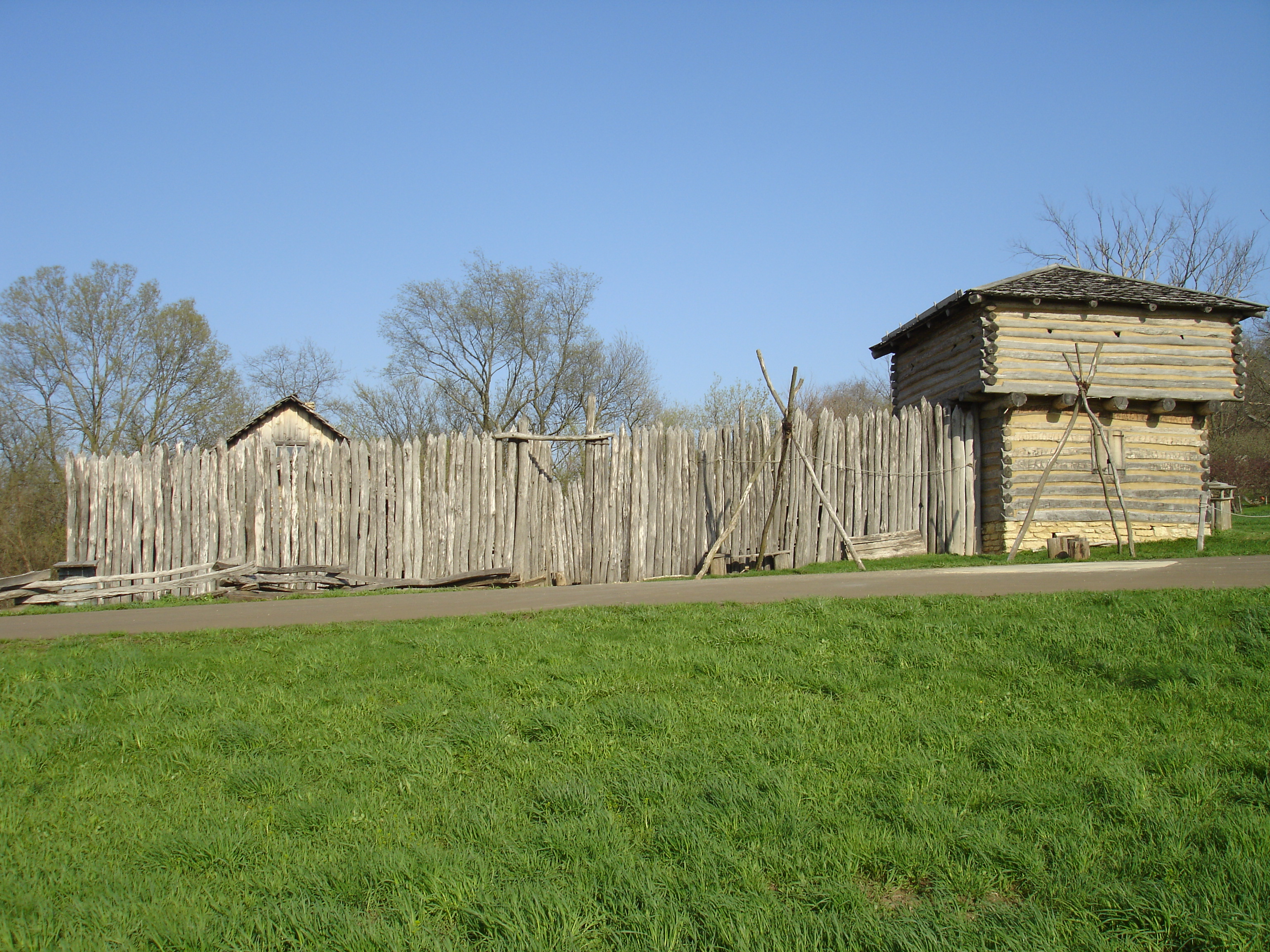
Reconstructed stockade and blockhouse similar to the original Fort Robinson.

Harry Harrison Hain describes the fort in his History of Perry County:

"It was a log fort, surrounded by a stockade. It occupied a site...located on a tableland with a good view of the surrounding country...The lowlands below were heavily wooded with large oak and maple, which also afforded protection in going to the fort. A spring was located at the foot of the bluff where water was secured with the least exposure, the distance from the stockade being only the steep bank — probably twenty feet...The fort was evidently in the nature of a block house, surrounded by a stockade built of heavy planks or poles. It was located along the famous Allegheny or Traders' Path and was the only source of protection for the traveler along the Allegheny Path between the Kittatinny or Blue Mountain and the Tuscarora."

The fort was built on a bluff overlooking Bixler's Run, a tributary of Shermans Creek, on land owned by George Robinson (1727–1814, also spelled Robison or Robeson), a homesteader who later became a justice of the peace and fought in the American Revolutionary War. His son James was killed in 1756 at the Battle of Sideling Hill and two other sons, William and Thomas, were killed defending Fort Robinson in 1763. His grandson, James Fisher Robinson, was governor of Kentucky.

The fort was located centrally in Shearman's Valley, on high ground with visibility in all directions. It stood close to a well-traveled trade route from Shearman's Valley to Harris' Ford, later the site of Harrisburg. The fort was built with private funds by local settlers and most likely consisted of a stockade surrounding a two-storey blockhouse, typical of non-military forts of that period. As of July, 1756 the fort was capable of housing 40 men and their families, although no militia were posted there. It was not occupied unless settlers needed to move there for security.

== History ==
=== Capture of Hugh Gibson ===
The earliest reference to the fort comes from the narrative of Hugh Gibson, who was captured in July, 1756 by Delaware Indians. In his first-person account published in 1811, he states that he was living at the time outside Robinson's Fort. Due to recent attacks by Indians, most of the local population had taken refuge inside the fort. Nearly all the adult males were either working in the fields and only two men remained at the fort as guards. Gibson, his mother, and Elizabeth Henry, a neighbor, were outside the fort looking for lost cattle when they were attacked by Lenape warriors. Gibson's mother was killed and he was taken captive by "a son of King Beaver." Elizabeth Henry was also captured, but the two were separated and Gibson never saw her again. Indians attacked the fort at the same time, killing a woman and a guard before the men in the fields returned to drive them off.

=== Woolcomber Massacre ===
In late 1756, men at the fort were alerted that the Woolcomber family had been massacred. Mr. Woolcomber had been warned, but he insisted that the Indians were harmless, and when they knocked on his door, he had invited them into his home for dinner. A 15-year-old boy escaped to the fort, reporting that his parents, sisters and brother were killed by the Indians. This event is referred to as the Woolcomber Massacre. Forty men were sent out from the fort to the Woolcomber homestead to bury the deceased.

In December 1757 and January 1758, James Patterson wrote to Deputy Governor William Denny from Fort Hunter: "I took with (me) 19 men & ranged from this Fort as far as Robinson's Fort, where I lodged, keeping a guard of six men & one Corporal on Centry that night."

=== Battle of Buffalo Creek ===
In July 1763, during Pontiac's War, Shawnee Indians raided the farms of William White and William Anderson, killing all but one of the inhabitants, a 15-year-old boy. Because of the war, many local settlers had taken refuge in Fort Robinson, but some had decided to return to their farms to harvest their fields. A dozen men from the fort, including three of George Robinson's sons, volunteered to try to reach those settlers who were harvesting in order to warn them. They also hoped to encounter the Shawnee war party and drive them off. The Shawnees discovered that they were being followed and ambushed the Robinson party at Buffalo Creek, killing five of them before the settlers fled. Two of George Robinson's sons, William and Thomas, were killed, but Robert Robinson escaped. He and the other survivors took several days to return to the fort. This encounter is known as the Battle of Buffalo Creek.

== Abandonment, 1764 ==
The fort was most likely abandoned after hostilities in Pontiac's War ended in late 1764. Traces of the fort were still visible in 1896, in an orchard planted after the fort was torn down.

== Archaeology ==
Attempts to locate and excavate the fort, as well as the site of the Woolcomber massacre, began in 2006, when test pits were dug near the 1922 historical marker. Dozens of unproductive pits were dug in 2006, 2007 and 2008. In 2009, the dig was moved to the former location of the Fort Robinson Railroad Station, but no evidence of the fort was uncovered. Archaeologists are now investigating another site, along an old Indian trail known as the "New Path" or the "New Trail" where it crosses Shermans Creek.

== Legacy ==
A stone monument dedicated in 1922 by the Perry County Historical Society can be seen on Pennsylvania Route 850 (Fort Robinson Road) on Bixler's Run, near Northeast Madison Township, Pennsylvania. A historical marker, erected in 1947 by the Pennsylvania Historical and Museum Commission, is visible nearby.
