= Christian Frederick Post =

Christian Frederick Post (an anglicanization of Christian Friedrich Post) (1710 Polish Prussia – 29 April 1785 Germantown, Pennsylvania) was a lay missionary of the Moravian Church to the Indigenous peoples of the Americas who played a brief but significant role in colonial diplomacy.

== Biography ==
Post came to Pennsylvania in 1742, and worked at forming groups of German heritage into a church federation, but was unsuited to the task. His facility in learning the native languages suited him better to organizing native groups. Between 1743 and 1749 was a missionary to the Moravian Indians in the Province of New York and the Connecticut Colony. His and his co-workers' activities were viewed with suspicion by the settlers: he was expelled from New York and Connecticut once, and another time he was jailed in New York for seven weeks.

He returned to Europe in 1751, and was afterwards sent to Labrador. He returned to Pennsylvania, and was again employed in missionary work. Following the 1755 Penn's Creek Massacre, he undertook an embassy in behalf of the Pennsylvania Colony in 1758 to the Lenape (Delaware) and Shawnee in the Ohio Country. He established an independent mission in the Ohio Country in 1761, and was joined in 1762 by John Heckewelder. Pontiac War forced them to abandon the project. In January, 1764, he sailed for the Mosquito Coast, where he labored for two years among the Miskito people, and made a second visit there in 1767. He afterwards worked as a lay missionary with the Church of England. He was elected to the American Society in 1768.

He retired in 1784 to Germantown.

== Family ==
He was married three times. His first two wives were Indigenous converts: Rachel, a Wampanoag, married him in 1743 and died about 1745, and Agnes, a Lenape, married him in 1747 and died in 1751. In 1763, he married Mary Margaret Stadelman Bolinger who survived him, dying in 1810. He had four children with his Indigenous wives; all died in infancy.
