= Tulpehocken Creek (Pennsylvania) =

River in the U.S. state of Pennsylvania

Coordinates: 40.3448°N 75.9506°W

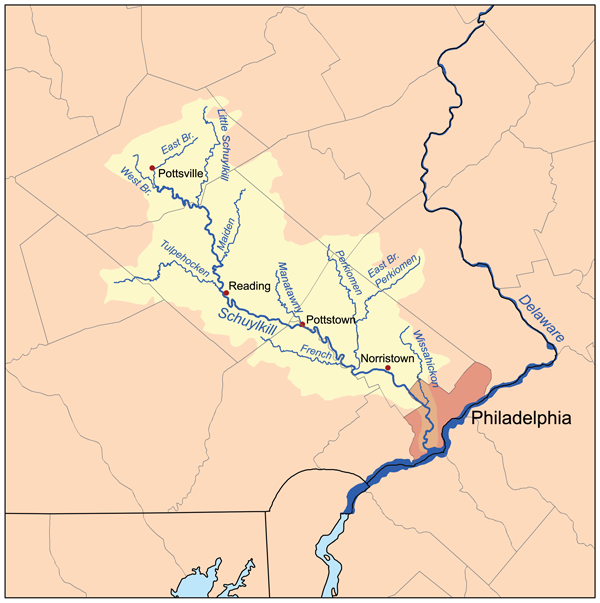
Schuylkill River watershed. Tulpehocken Creek joins the Schuylkill River near Reading in the map.

Tulpehocken Creek is a 39.5-mile-long (63.6 km) tributary of the Schuylkill River in southeastern Pennsylvania in the United States, and during the American Canal Age, once provided nearly half the length of the Union Canal linking the port of Philadelphia, the largest American city and the other communities of Delaware Valley with the Susquehanna basin and the Pennsylvania Canal System connecting the Eastern seaboard to Lake Erie and the new settlements of the Northwest Territory via the Allegheny, Monongahela, and Ohio Rivers at Pittsburgh.

An important transportation route in the early United States, the creek drains a limestone hill country area of Berks County south of the Appalachian Mountains and is considered one of the finest trout streams in southeastern Pennsylvania. The valley of the creek was known in colonial times as the Tulpehocken, stretching west of Reading. It was inhabited by the Lenape and was a destination for early German-speaking settlers. The name comes from a Lenape word Tulpewikaki, meaning "land of turtles". It is a designated Pennsylvania Scenic River. Major tributaries include the Cacoosing Creek, Spring Creek and Northkill Creek.

== Description ==
Tulpehocken Creek rises in North Lebanon Township, Lebanon County, Pennsylvania at the westernmost point in the Delaware River watershed. It flows generally east, in a winding course, through Myerstown, entering Berks County, passing north of Womelsdorf. At Womelsdorf it turns abruptly north, then flows southeast, through the Blue Marsh Lake reservoir and joins the Schuylkill at Reading.

In the 1720s, the creek's valley, like many in those days of dependence upon water power with a poor transportation infrastructure system, was a destination for early Swiss and Palatine settlers, who used the creek for extensive milling operations. In the 19th century, as it had for the light canoes of the Susquehannock and Delaware peoples, it provided an important early transportation route with the building in 1828 of the Union Canal along the river, connecting from its headwaters to those of Quittapahilla Creek in Lebanon County.

Pennsylvania had been foremost among the colonies in canal building, for it had surveyed as early as 1762 the first lock canal in America, from near Reading on the Schuylkill to Middletown on the Susquehanna.

— Archer B. Hurlbert (1920), Chapter III:, The Paths of Inland Commerce

The proposed canal, again surveyed in the 1790s as the private stock corporation Schuylkill and Susquehanna Navigation Company and its successor, the Union canal taken together with the Schuylkill Canal (1822) running W-E from Reading to Philadelphia (allowing large shipments of coal to Philadelphia), provided one of only two water routes between the Susquehanna River and the Delaware River. The other was the Chesapeake and Delaware canal. Using the canal, manufacturies in Philadelphia and New Jersey could ship goods west to the newly settled lands west of the gaps of the Allegheny, out to the midwest. The Union canal and the Schuylkill Canal companies were private stock companies and worked with the State built Pennsylvania Canal to tranship grain to Philadelphia. The improvements along Tulpehocken Creek by engineering navigations of the two companies provided nearly half the length of the final Union Canal completed in 1828.

The creek is impounded for flood control above Reading by the earthen Blue Marsh Dam (see Blue Marsh State Park) completed in 1979 by the U.S. Army Corps of Engineers to form the Blue Marsh Lake reservoir. The bottom-release design of the dam allows for the discharge of a cold water at a constant temperature, resulting in an ideal habitat for rainbow trout and brown trout, which are stocked annually in the stream.

== See also ==
- List of rivers of Pennsylvania
- Canal Age
- Schuylkill and Susquehanna Navigation Company
- Union Canal (Pennsylvania)
- Schuylkill Canal
