= Kuskusky =

Kuskusky Gas-Cagh-Sa-Gey
- Historic Native American village
- Etymology: Iroquoian languages: koskohsh-ehtoh "at the falls, by the falls or rapids" Unami: kwësh-kwëshelxus-kee "hogs" + -kee (suffix used in place names) "Hogs Town"
- Location of Pennsylvania in the United States

- Former location of Kuskusky in Pennsylvania Kuskusky (the United States)
- Coordinates: 40°59′50″N 80°20′40″W
- State: Pennsylvania
- Present-day Community: New Castle, Pennsylvania
- Founded: 1720
- Abandoned: 8 February 1778

Population
  - Estimate (1758): 300−400

Kuskusky, also known as the Kuskuskies Towns, Kuskuskie Towns, or Kuskuskies' Indian Town, with a wide variety of other spellings, were several Native American communities inhabited near New Castle, Mahoning, and Edinburg, Pennsylvania, and Youngstown, Ohio, during the mid-18th century. It was not one town, but three or four contiguous towns of the Mingoes, Lenape, and Seneca, located along the Beaver River, at and above the junction of its east and west branches, the Mahoning River and the Shenango River. It is usually referred to in the plural.

== Etymology ==
Several different origins have been proposed for the name "Kuskusky." In the 1826 captivity narrative of Hugh Gibson, captured by Lenape in July, 1756, he states that he lived in the spring and fall of 1757 at "Kuskuskin, or Hog Town" on the Mahoning (kwësh-kwëshelxus means "hog" in the Unami dialect)." The word may also have come from the Seneca koskohsh-ehtoh, meaning "at the falls, by the falls or rapids," referring to Beaver Falls, Pennsylvania.

== Establishment ==
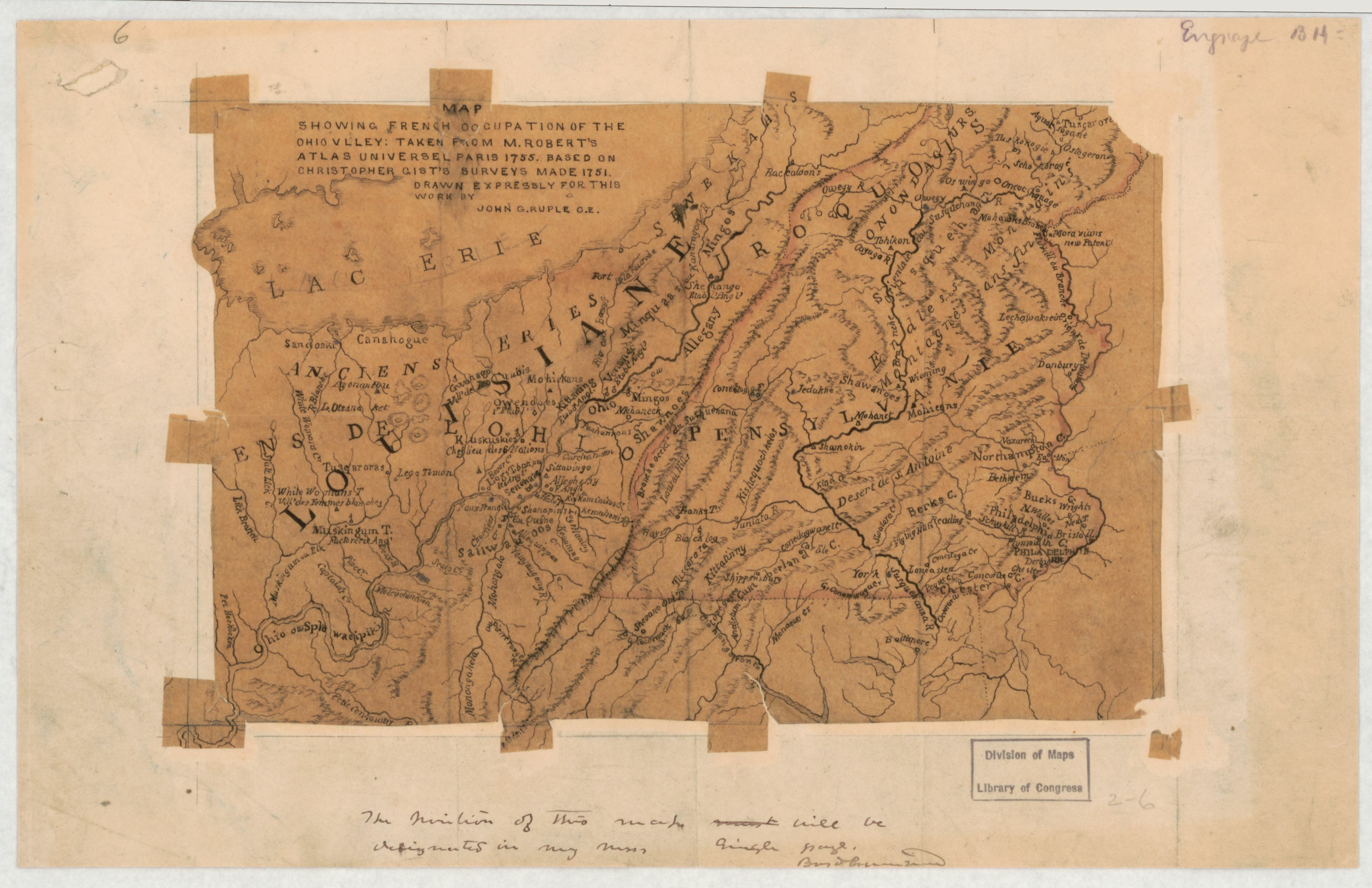
Map showing the French occupation of the Ohio Valley, based on Christopher Gist's surveys of 1751, showing "Kuskuskies, chef-lieu des 6 Nations" to the left of map's center.

There was very likely a settlement of some kind in the vicinity as early as 1720, initially established by Lenape, Seneca and Shawnee Indians moving west after being displaced from the Susquehanna Valley by growing European settlements and the increasing scarcity of game due to overhunting. A smallpox epidemic in 1733 and a drought in 1741 may have led to the arrival of new groups, under pressure to resettle. Two Seneca villages with the same name were established before 1742, one at the mouth of the Shenango River and the other at the mouth of Neshannock Creek. English traders, looking for new sources of skins and furs, established trading posts that, in turn, attracted Natives seeking sources of European trade goods, particularly liquor, which was becoming a fixture in Native American culture by the early 18th century.

On 11 November 1747 the Seneca leader Kanuksusy traveled from Kuskusky to Philadelphia with ten young Mingo warriors to deliver news of French activities in western Pennsylvania. These were the first reports to be heard from outside the colony. He later addressed the Pennsylvania Council, declaring that he and his group were representatives of the Six Nations and confirmed its neutrality during King George's War, which had earlier been decided at the Onondaga Council.

In April, 1748 Orontony and 119 Wyandot warriors, together with Miami Indian warriors led by Memeskia, attacked and burned the French Fort St. Philippe (Fort Miami). Orontony then abandoned his community of Junundat and set off for the Ohio valley. About 70 of the warriors and their families settled at Conchake (present-day Coshocton, Ohio). The remainder went farther east to build a new town at Kuskusky.

== Rivalry with Logstown, 1748 ==
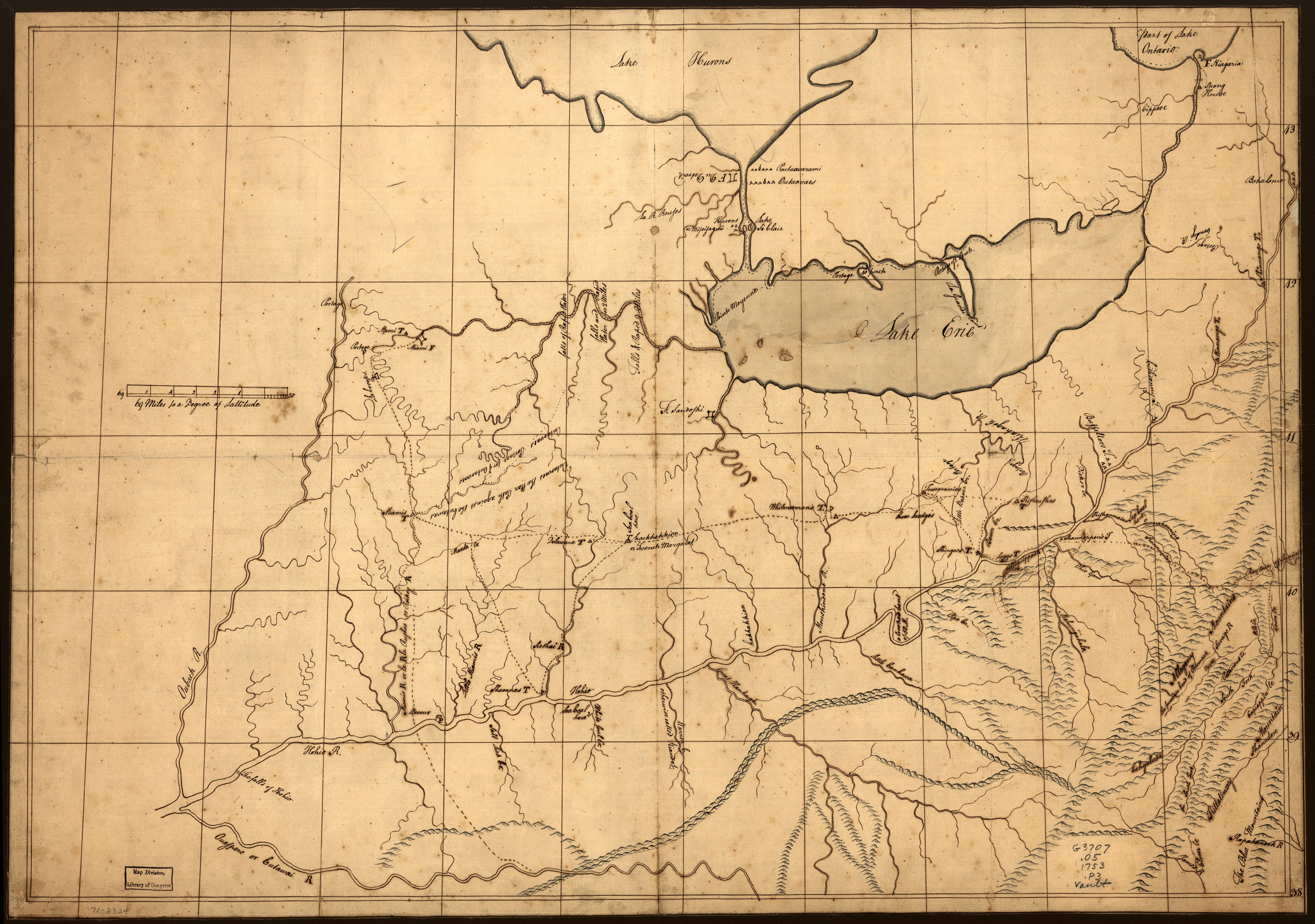
1752 trader's map of the Ohio Country drawn by John Patten, showing "Kisheuskes" on the right side of the page, south of Lake Erie.

At this time, the rival colonies of Pennsylvania and Virginia were competing against Canada to attain control over the Ohio Country, a source of skins and furs and a geographic middle ground between the eastern colonies and the Mississippi and lands west of it. For Canada, control of the Ohio also facilitated commerce and communication with Louisiana. As the prospect of war between Britain and France grew increasingly imminent, Native American inhabitants of the Ohio River Valley were attempting to maintain their autonomy while extracting valuable trade goods from the Europeans. In November, 1747 Scarouady and other Iroquois leaders visited Philadelphia to sign the "Treaty Between the President and Council of the Province of Pennsylvania and the Ohio Indians," promising a military alliance against the French in exchange for supplies and trade goods. The Council obtained £200 worth of goods and sent Croghan to Logstown in April, 1748 to cement the terms of the treaty and secure the tribes' loyalty to the British. Conrad Weiser was to follow in August with more gifts.

After destroying Fort St. Philippe, Orontony and other Wyandot leaders had no choice but to seek an alliance with the English, but Orontony was anxious to get assurances from Philadelphia that the English would offer military support as well as abundant trade goods, on which the Indians were growing increasingly dependent. As Tanacharisson's influence in negotiating terms with Pennsylvania grew, Orontony and other Iroquois leaders in Kuskusky wanted to get the attention of Philadelphia. Soon after Weiser arrived at Logstown, he received a message on 1 September 1748: "Andrew Montour came back from Coscosky with a message from the Indians there to desire of me that the ensuing Council might be held at their town." Tanacharisson insisted that "the Indians at Coscosky were no more Chiefs than themselves, and that last spring they had nothing to eat, & expecting that they shou'd have nothing to eat at our arrival." In any case, Weiser's instructions bound him to negotiate with the Indians at Logstown, and he replied to the request, saying that "the Shawonese and Twightwees would be offended if the Council was to be held at Coscosky." On 15 September Orontony and five other Wyandot chiefs arrived in Logstown and met with Weiser, presenting him with a gift of seven beaver skins. Weiser wrote that they "behav’d like People of good Sense & Sincerity; the most of them are grey-headed." Another chief from Kuskusky, Canajachrera or Oniadagarehra (Broken Kettle or Big Kettle), met Weiser on 19 September. In 1750, after Orontony's sudden death from smallpox, Canajachrera became the acting leader at Kuskusky. In late 1748 the Pennsylvania Council sent the Indians at Kuskusky (Gas-Cagh-Sa-Gey) 12 barrels of gunpowder as a gift and a peace-offering after having rejected their request to hold the council at their town.

== Commerce with English traders ==
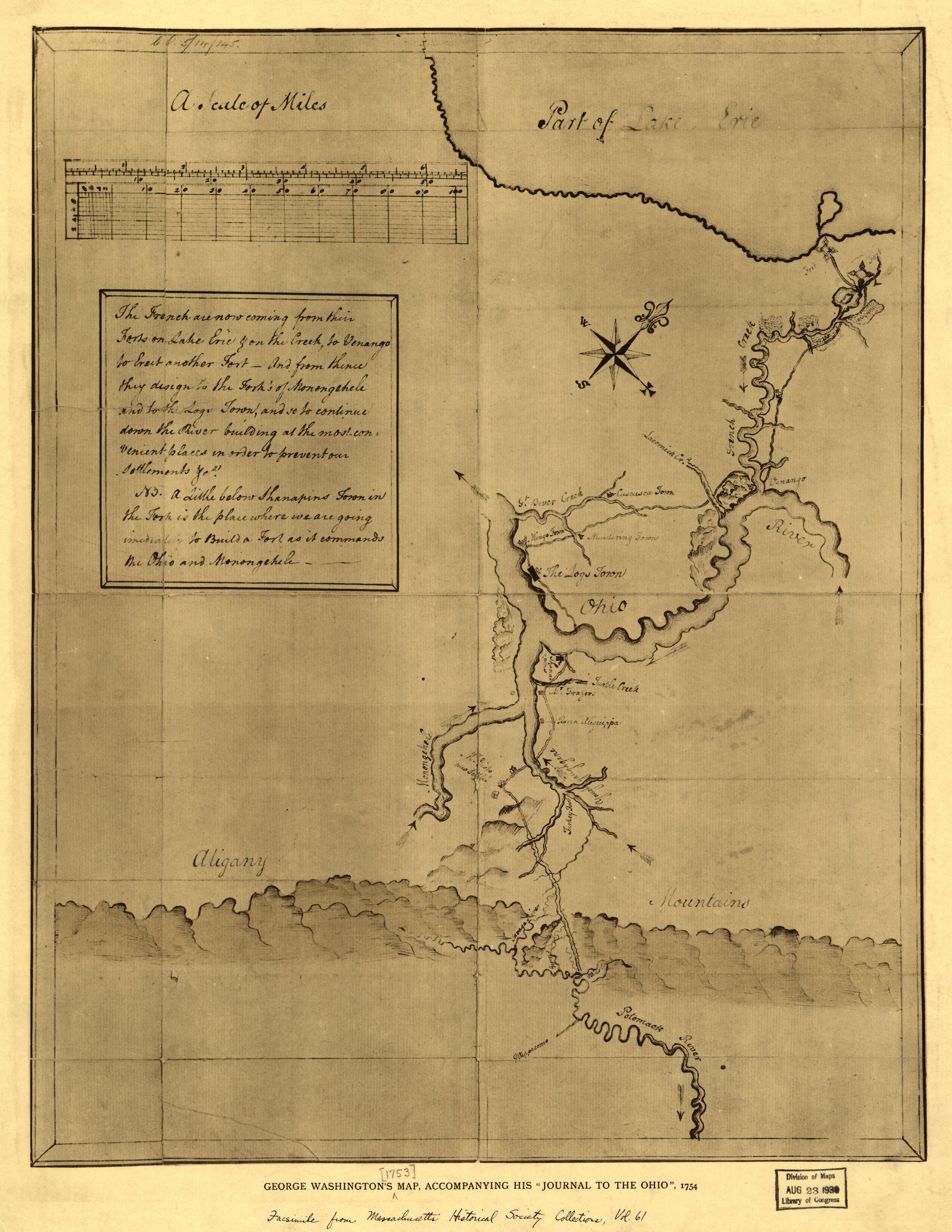
George Washington's 1754 map of the confluence of the Ohio and the Monongahela rivers, showing "Cuscusca Town," upper right quadrant, just under the compass.

By 1748, English traders set up trading posts at each of the Kuskuskies towns, drawing some of the fur trade away from French traders to the north. The demand for rum as a trade item was particularly high, leading to some violence. On October 20, 1748, William Trent wrote to Secretary Richard Peters, describing a murder which took place at Kuskusky:

Last night came here from Allegheny one John Hays, who informs us that the night before he left it, the Indians killed one of Mr. [Hugh] Parker's [a factor of the Ohio Company] hands...Mr. Parker had a large quantity of liquor up with him, which he was tying up in his goods, in order to send to the Lower Shawna Town; and the Indians kept pressing into his house...Some he turned out, and others, as they came in, he pushed the door in their faces; upon which they were determined to take his liquor...They brought him wampum, and offered to leave it in pledge; but he refused to let them have it; upon which they took a quantity from him. A great many of them got drunk, who then insisted upon revenge for the ill-treatment he gave them; and accordingly took Parker prisoner and tyed him, and determined to scalp him. But the rest of the whites who were in the town rescued him. He immediately went off...to the Logs Town. The Indians imagined that he was gone into his house. One of them laid wait for him at the door, with his gun. At last, one Brown, one of Mr. Parker's hands, came out...which the Indian took for Parker...and shot him down. This happened at Coscoske.

In spite of this event, Parker maintained his trading post at Kuskusky and in 1749 employed Barnaby Curran to manage it after Brown was killed.

== Encounter with Céloron de Blainville, 1749 ==
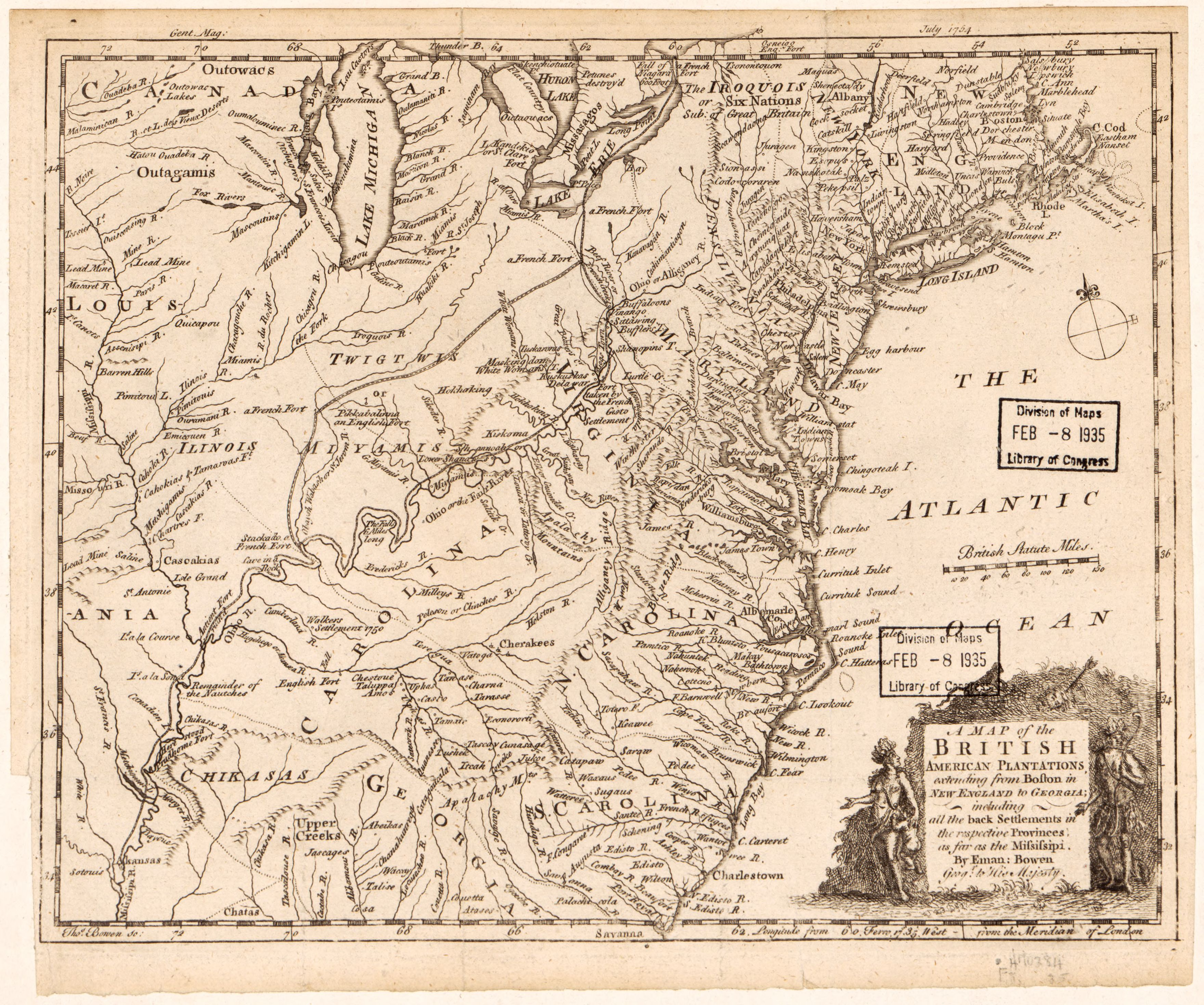
1754 map of British plantations in North America, showing "Kuskuskas, Delawar," center of map.

In the summer of 1749 Pierre Joseph Céloron de Blainville, leading a force of eight officers, six cadets, an armorer, 20 soldiers, 180 Canadians, 30 Iroquois and 25 Abenakis, moved down the Ohio River on a flotilla of 23 large boats and birch-bark canoes, on his "lead plate expedition," burying lead plates at six locations where major tributaries entered the Ohio and nailing copper plates bearing royal arms to trees to claim the territory for New France. After stopping at the abandoned village of Kittanning, Céloron arrived at Logstown on August 8, 1749. That night, the French were warned that "80 warriors starting from Kaskaské were on the point of arriving; that they came intending to aid their brothers, and to deal us a blow." Céloron ordered his men to prepare for battle, but there was no attack, and instead the warriors appeared at the French camp "and made the accustomed salute. They may have numbered about fifty men." The Jesuit priest Joseph Pierre de Bonnecamps, who accompanied Céloron, wrote that "the savages, seeing our bold front and our superior number, quietly withdrew and saluted us very politely in passing before our camp."

Although the French expedition was never attacked, the potential for violence remained throughout the journey, and Céloron was conscious that his mostly inexperienced troops would probably not have performed well. On the other hand, the Indians chose not to attack, as they did not want to risk bringing a stronger French military force into the Ohio country, which likely would have been the response. They therefore confined themselves to shooting holes in the French flag when Céloron visited Lower Shawneetown a week later. However, on his return to Canada, Céloron reported that "the nations of these localities are very badly disposed towards the French, and are entirely devoted to the English." This led to the destruction of Pickawillany in June, 1752 and the killing of Memeskia, one of Orontony's allies, and to the decision by the Governor-General of New France to send a sizeable French military force under the command of Paul Marin de la Malgue to build a road and construct Fort Presque Isle, Fort Le Boeuf, and Fort Machault in 1753 and 1754.

== The Kuskusky Path ==
Following the construction of Fort Duquesne in 1754, the Kuskusky Path, a trail leading from Kuskusky to the fort, was used by hunters, traders, warriors, militia, and diplomats throughout the 1700s. The Kuskusky Path (sometimes called the Kuskusky-Kittanning Path) is generally regarded as a continuation of the Great Shamokin Path that connected Native settlements at Shamokin (present-day Sunbury, Pennsylvania) on the Susquehanna River with Kittanning along the banks of the Allegheny River. It eventually became a paved road leading from New Castle to Pittsburgh.

== Captives ==
1755 map by John Mitchell showing "Kuskuskies, Chief Town of the 6 Nations on the Ohio, an English Factory (trading post)," upper left of map's center.

At the beginning of the French and Indian War, the defeat of General Edward Braddock in July, 1755 left Pennsylvania without a professional military force. Shawnee and Delaware warriors launched dozens of raids against English settlements, killing and capturing hundreds of people and destroying communities across western and central Pennsylvania. The Kuskuskies were used as a holding site where prisoners were brought immediately after a raid.

Marie Le Roy and Barbara Leininger, both age 12, were captured during the Penn's Creek massacre on 16 October 1755. They were taken to Punxsutawney, Pennsylvania, then to Kittanning, where they lived until Armstrong's attack in September 1756. After Kittanning was destroyed, the Indians moved for a time to Fort Duquesne, then in the spring of 1757 the two girls were brought to "Kaschkaschkung, an Indian town on the Beaver Creek." There they had to "clear the plantations...to plant corn, and to do other hard work of every kind." They lived at Kuskusky for about eighteen months. In late August, 1758 they were visited by the Moravian missionary Christian Frederick Post, but not permitted to speak with him. On 12 October 1758, French and Indian forces from nearby Fort Duquesne were defeated in an attack on the British outpost of Fort Ligonier, and the population of the Kuskusky towns fled, taking the girls to Muskingum in Ohio. They escaped with Hugh Gibson in March 1759. At the end of their captivity narrative, Marie Le Roy and Barbara Leininger listed by name twenty-one others then held at the Kuskuskies.

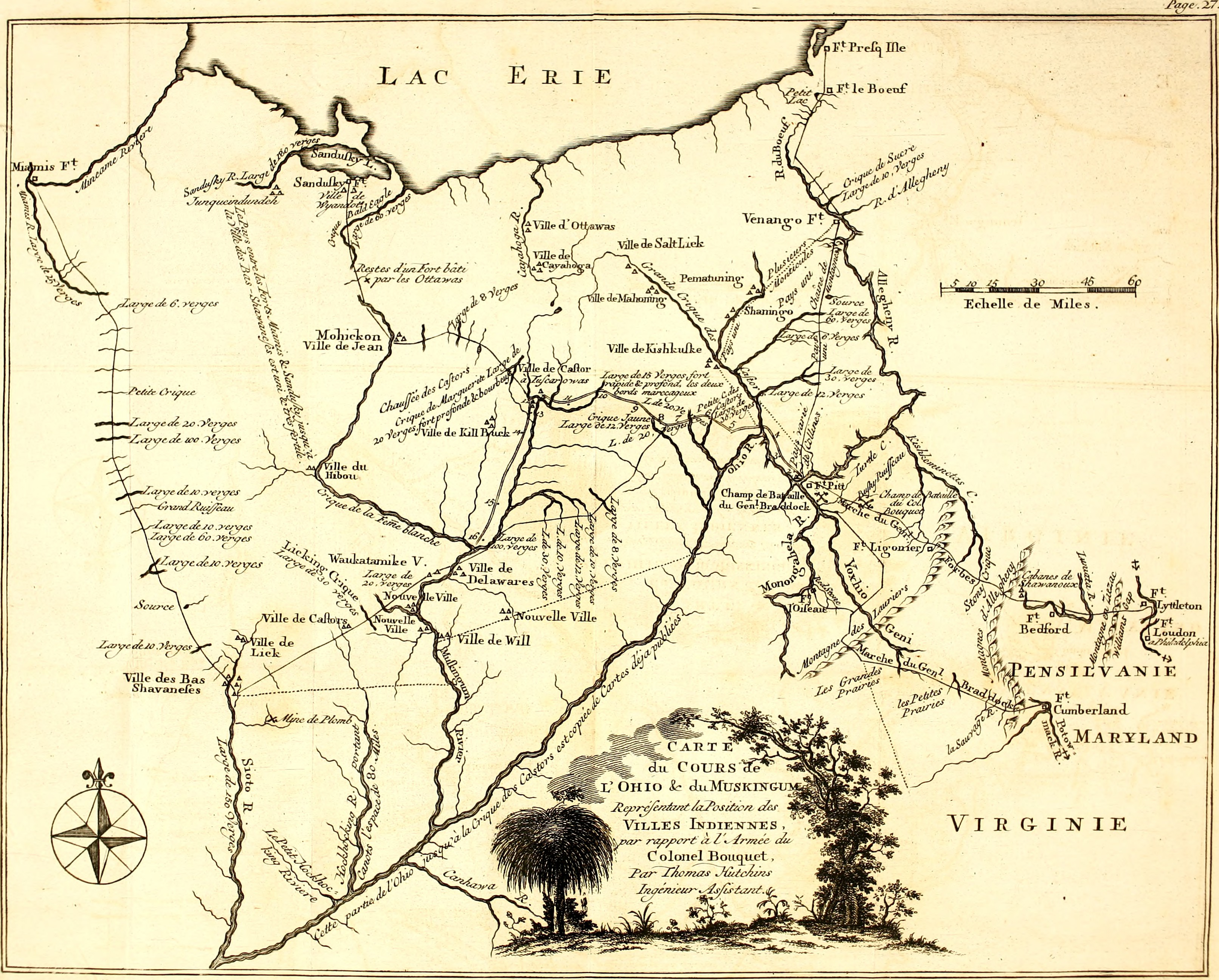
French map of 1769 showing "Ville de Kishkuske," upper center. Based on a map by Thomas Hutchins.

Hugh Gibson, 14, was captured in July, 1756 by Lenape Indians, outside Robinson's Fort, near present-day Southwest Madison Township, Pennsylvania, north of Carlisle, Pennsylvania. His mother and a neighbor were killed by the Indians, and he was brought to Kittanning, where he was adopted by Shingas' brother Pisquetomen, a Delaware chief (who Gibson refers to as "Bisquittam"). Gibson was living in Kittanning when it was attacked by Colonel John Armstrong's forces on 8 September 1756. After the attack, he was taken to "Kuskuskin [Hog-Town] on the Mahoning." While there, Gibson one day remarked that "he had heard that the white people were coming against the Indians," which was overheard by Pisquetomen's brother and his wife, who said they would see Gibson burnt alive as soon as Pisquetomen returned. Pisquetomen instead took Gibson to live with him in a tent outside Kuskusky, rather than have him killed. In March, 1759, Gibson escaped, together with Marie Le Roy and Barbara Leininger and a Scotsman named David Brackenridge, and walked 250 miles to Fort Pitt (then under construction).

Richard and Catharine Bard were captured by Lenape Indians at their mill in York County, Pennsylvania, on 13 April 1758. Six others, including two children and Thomas Potter, brother of General James Potter, were also captured, and the mill was burned. The prisoners were taken to Fort Duquesne, but on the way Thomas Potter, one of the children and another man were killed, and Richard Bard escaped. Catharine Bard was taken to Kuskusky where she was forced to watch the torture and death of another male prisoner. After a few days she was taken to Shomoken, a Lenape village near Crosswicks, New Jersey, where she lived until her husband returned to ransom her.

== Peace negotiations, 1758 ==
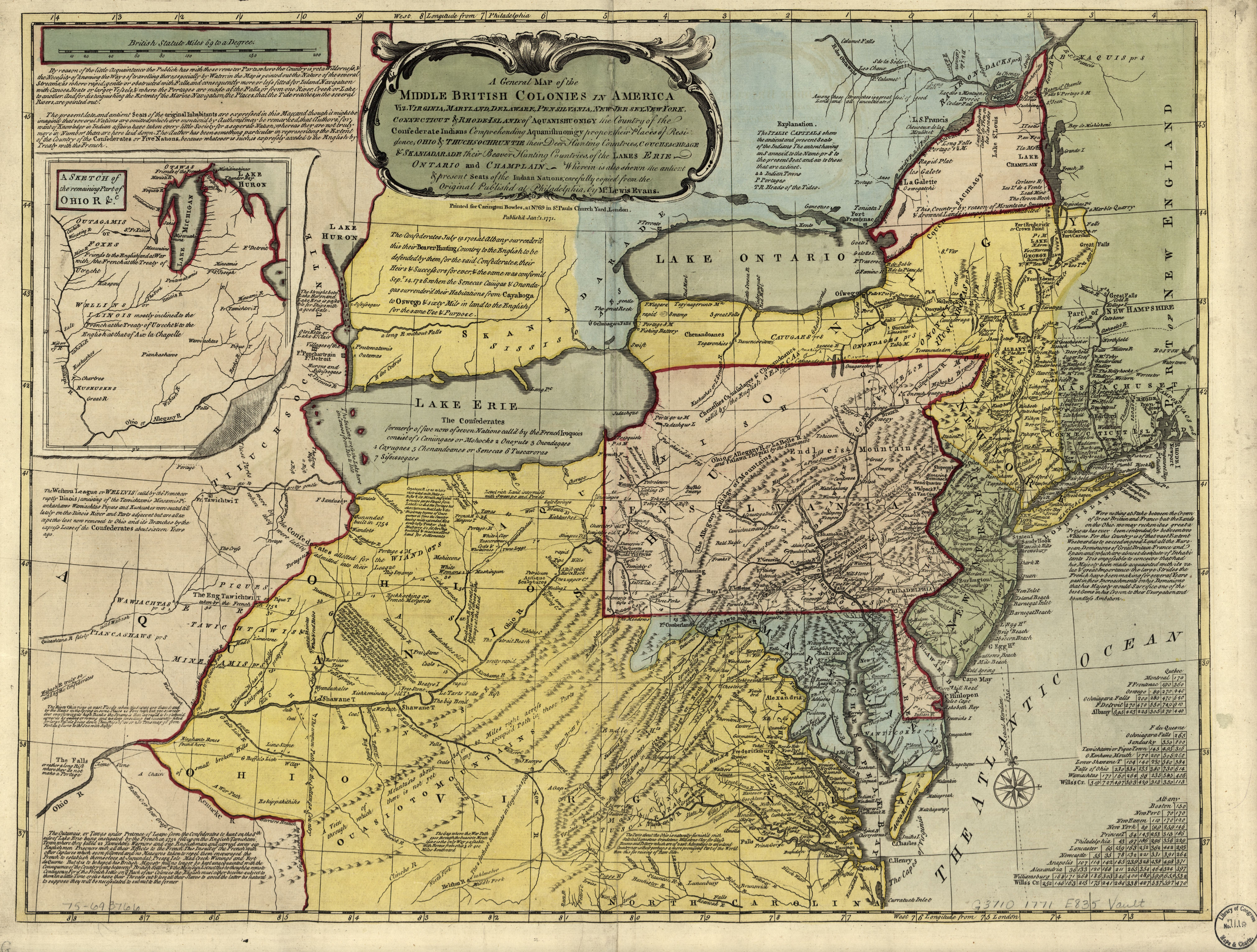
1771 map of the British colonies in America showing "Kishkuskes" just left of the map's center.

After the raid on Kittanning in 1756, those of the population who were neutral or sympathetic to the English moved to Kuskusky, while those with pro-French sympathies resettled near Fort Duquesne and Logstown. The English realized that without Native American support, the French would be unable to continue the war, therefore they initiated a series of negotiations with Delaware leaders in an attempt to make them withdraw from the fighting. Fearing that the ever-advancing European settlers would permanently take control of their lands, Delaware chiefs hoped to bargain for a binding treaty that would grant them protected space. Pennsylvania Deputy Governor William Denny asked Christian Frederick Post to act as negotiator at Kuskusky. Post was an experienced frontiersman and had two Delaware wives, spoke the language well, and the Delawares trusted him. He was instructed by Deputy Governor Denny to offer amnesty to all Delawares who had participated in frontier raids against Pennsylvania if they would now support the British. Post and Pisquetomen, his brothers Shingas and Tamaqua, met at the Kuskuskies on 12 August 1758. Post described "Kushkushkee" as "a large Spot of Land about three Miles long," saying that it was "divided into four Towns, each at a Distance from the others, and the whole consists of about 90 Houses and 200 able Warriors." Post encountered some French soldiers living in the town:

The French came and would speak with me. There were then 15 of them building Houses for the Indians. The Captain is gone with 15 to another Town. He can speak the Indian Tongue well. The Indians say he is a cunning Fox; that they get a great deal of Goods from the French; and that the French cloath the Indians every Year, Men Women, and Children, and give them as much Powder and Lead as they want.

Post assured Tamaqua and the other Delaware leaders that the English wanted peace. Post then left Kuskusky for a few days to visit Saucunk and Logstown, and to address a group of Indians in front of Fort Duquesne, with French officers watching. He then returned to Kuskusky to discuss the Treaty of Easton with the Delaware leaders. On 6 September he was presented to the two captives, Marie Le Roy and Barbara Leininger, but they did not speak. Post left Kuskusky on 8 September and continued down the Ohio to address other Delawares and their Shawnee and Mingo allies.

In October, 1758 the Treaty of Easton was signed between British colonials and representatives of 13 Indian nations, including the chiefs of the Iroquois, the eastern and western Lenape and the Shawnee. Negotiations over more than a week were concluded on October 26, 1758, at a ceremony held in Easton, Pennsylvania, between the British colonial governors of the provinces of Pennsylvania and New Jersey and tribal leaders. The treaty shifted the balance of power in favor of the British by removing several important Native tribes from the fighting, and was one of several factors leading to the surrender of Fort Duquesne in late November.

Christian Frederick Post returned to Kuskusky in November to celebrate with Delaware leaders who had helped him bring the Delawares to the treaty, but some warriors were angry with Post over a letter he had written which had been captured by the French, the contents of which had been misrepresented in order to discredit Post. Post writes:

These three Days past was precarious Time for Us. We were warned not to go far from the House, because the People...were possessed with a murdering Spirit, which led them as in a Halter in which they were catched, and with bloody Vengeance were thirsty and drunk.

On 22 November, word reached the town that General John Forbes was approaching Fort Duquesne and that the French had set fire to the fort and were retreating. The Indians were overjoyed and danced until midnight, and Post's letter was forgotten. Post left Kuskusky on 29 November and returned to Philadelphia.

== Later history ==
=== Abandonment, 1759 ===
Thomas Hutchins' 1778 map of Virginia, Pennsylvania, Maryland, and North Carolina, shows "Kishkuske," on Big Beaver Creek, center of upper right quadrant.

The Kuskuskies Towns appear to have been largely abandoned after 1758, for reasons that remain unclear. These may have included military actions at the very end of the French and Indian War, the encroaching English settlements, the lack of game due to over-hunting, or a combination of these. Many Native American communities were relocating farther west into the Ohio Country. On 7 February 1759, Colonel Hugh Mercer received a report from a Mohican scout that he had observed "at the Salt Spring above Kaskaskias [Kuskuskies] a large number of [French] troops." Mercer then held an important council with the Delawares at Fort Pitt. At that time, Tamaqua was living at Saucunk (near present-day Rochester, Pennsylvania). At this council on February 24, he announced that the Delawares wanted to move in order to avoid any fighting between the French and the British, stating, "The Six Nations and you desire that I would sit down and smoke my pipe at Kuskusky. I tell you this that you may think no ill of my removing from Saucunk to Kuskusky, for it is at the great desire of my brothers, the English, and my uncles, the Six Nations, and there I shall always hear your words." Mercer reportedly replied, "Your Brothers, the English, desire to see you live in Peace and Happiness, either at Saucunk, Kuskusky, or wherever you think proper, and by no means intend to Limit you to one Place or another." In the spring of 1759, the Delawares moved from Saucunk and Kuskuskee to communities on the Muskingum River and the Scioto River in Ohio.

=== Moravian missionaries ===
In 1769 Custaloga brought a small group of Munsees from the Cuyahoga River Valley to settle at Kuskusky in order to be near English trading posts and Friedenstadt, a Moravian mission established by David Zeisberger. The missionaries generated controversy, however, as they banned the consumption of alcohol and discouraged many traditional ceremonies. After Custaloga's death in 1775, the community broke up and many people returned to Ohio.

=== The Squaw Campaign, 1778 ===
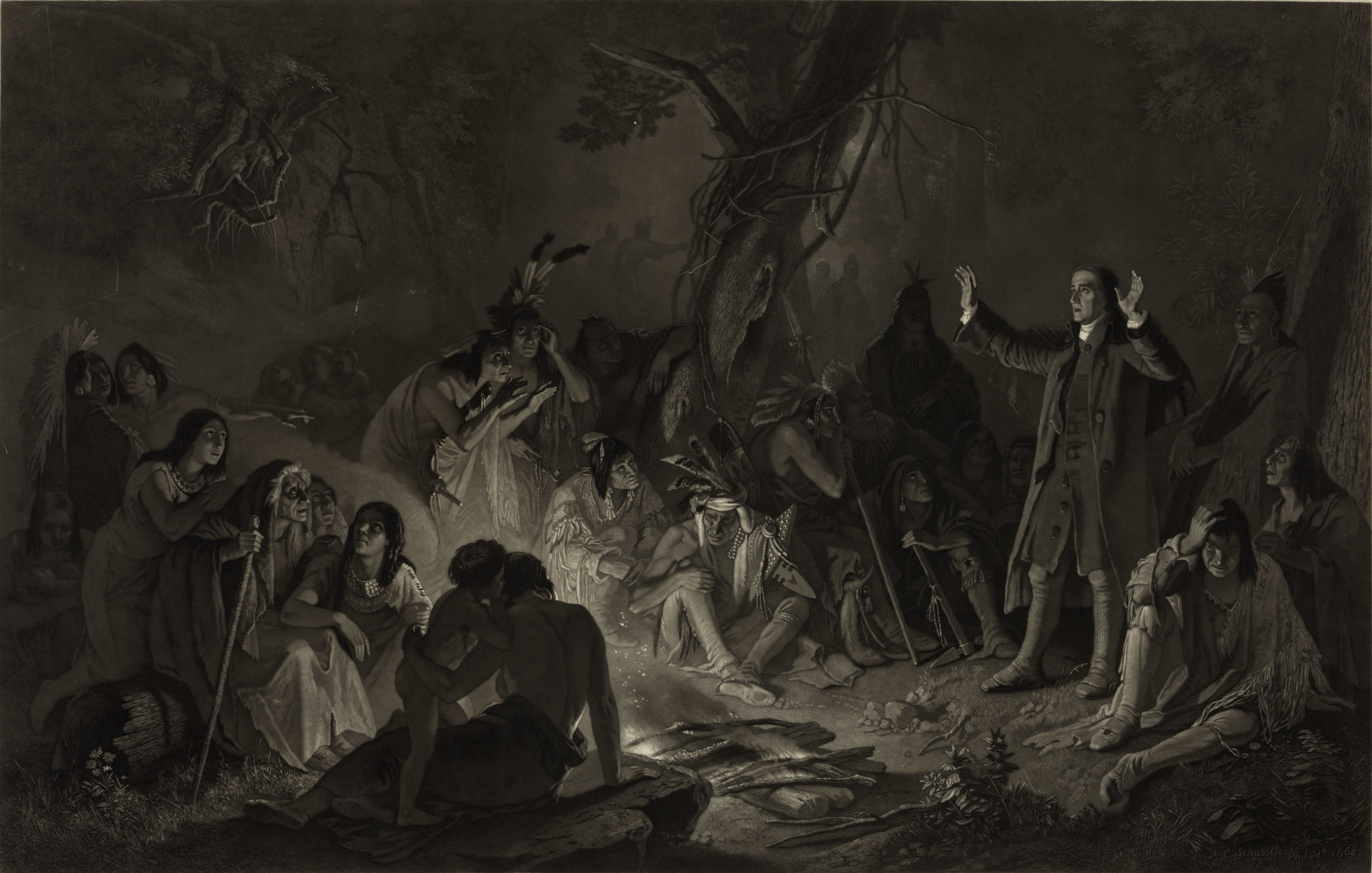
Moravian missionary David Zeisberger preaching to the Indians.

Kuskusky maintained a small population of Delawares during the 1770s. In early February 1778, General Edward Hand launched a campaign against the Seneca-Cayuga people who had reportedly received guns and powder from the British with which to defend themselves against invading American settlers. Hand led a force of five hundred militia in search of Indian war parties, but failed to find any. On returning to Fort Pitt, the men discovered a small group of Lenape Indians at Kuskusky, and attacked, unaware that the Lenape were currently neutral and at peace with the Americans. Among those killed were the mother and brother of Chief Hopocan, known as Captain Pipe. The troops also killed several women and a child they found in a nearby Munsee village. The exploit became known as "The Squaw Campaign" because of this. George Morgan, the Patriot Commissioner of Indian Affairs, Middle District, later apologized to the Lenape.

=== New Kuskusky ===
The site was permanently abandoned by the Delawares after 1778. Following the American Revolutionary War, settlers moved into the area. In 1798, John Carlyle Stewart traveled to western Pennsylvania to resurvey the "donation lands," which had been reserved for veterans. He claimed approximately 50 acres (20 ha) at the confluence of the Shenango River and Neshannock Creek, at that time a part of Allegheny County, and the site of the easternmost of the Kuskuskies towns. For a short time the town was named "New Kuskusky." The town of New Castle was named after New Castle, Delaware, and became a borough in Lawrence County by 1825, with a population of 300.

== Archaeological investigations ==
Archaeological work in the area has uncovered evidence of habitation as old as 16,500 years. The State Museum of Pennsylvania has several strings of glass beads, a silver ornament with an engraved deer, and a fire striker set consisting of an English flint and iron striker, all collected at the Kuskuskies Town site in Lawrence County, during a 1960 archaeological investigation.

Charles A. Hanna (1911) describes the archaeology of the Kuskusky region:

It is at least certain there was a village where Edinburg stands, which was divided into two parts, one a short distance farther up the river than the other...In the vicinity have been picked up gun-flints, oxidized bullets, flattened and battered, old gun-locks and gun-barrels, bayonets, etc....Many bones have also been found. Near the Town was a burial ground, containing, among other relics, an interesting mound, originally some fifty feet in circumference, and about six feet high. This mound was examined some years since, and found to contain several layers of human skeletons; flag-stones were placed in regular order around the bodies, and the whole covered with earth. Nearby were quite a large number of bodies, buried separately. Large numbers of flint chips and arrow-heads have been picked up in the vicinity.

== Legacy ==
A plaque commemorating the 1758 peace treaty that was confirmed with the help of Christian Frederick Post and King Beaver (Tamaqua), was erected in 1925 at Slippery Rock, Pennsylvania, by the Historical Society of Slippery Rock. The plaque refers to the treaty, mandating the retreat of Lenape Indians from Fort Duquesne, as "the most important treaty ever concluded with the North American Indians [which] made possible the winning of the French and Indian War."

== See also ==
- Kittanning (village)
- History of Pennsylvania
- Logstown
- Shamokin (village)
