= John Patten (frontiersman) =

- Born: ca. 1725; Wilmington, Delaware
- Died: after July 1754 (age 29); Labrador, Canada
- Other name: John Pattin
- Occupations: Fur trader, cartographer, Arctic explorer
- Years active: 1750-1754
- Known for: Two maps of the Ohio Country made in 1752 and 1753

John Patten (ca. 1725 - 1754, also known as John Pattin), was a fur trader, explorer and map maker known initially for his travels in the Ohio Country, and later for his Arctic exploration. He produced two important maps of Ohio and western Pennsylvania, as well as one of the east coast of Labrador. He was held captive for two years by the French and released through the intervention of the British ambassador to France. He died on an exploratory journey to eastern Canada in 1754, at the age of 29.

== Birth and early life ==
Patten was born in Wilmington in what is now Delaware but at the time was part of Pennsylvania, in about 1725. His education is unknown, but the two maps attributed to him suggest some training in surveying and cartography. He was employed as "draftsman and mineralist" on his arctic voyages, indicating some training in geology. In June 1750, he went on horseback to western Pennsylvania, stopping to buy £91 worth of supplies at John Harris' trading post in Harris Ferry in July. He then returned to Wilmington. In a deposition he made while imprisoned by the French, Patten stated that he obtained a trading license from the governor of Pennsylvania, then left his Wilmington home on August 24, 1750, and traveled to the Ohio Country to trade for furs with Native Americans there.

== Arrest and imprisonment, 1750 ==
In November 1750 Patten stopped at Pickawillany on his way to trade with Native communities on the St. Marys River. On November 20, after trading with the Indians, Patten went to Fort St. Philippe to purchase supplies (in another statement, Patten reported that the Indians told him that the French invited him to the fort), where the commandant, Louis Coulon de Villiers, ordered him to be arrested and his goods confiscated. Patten was then taken to Detroit, where he was examined by Pierre Joseph Céloron de Blainville and charged with encroachment on French territory and "endeavoring to debauch our Indians," and was imprisoned briefly at Fort Niagara. During the next nine months he was transferred to prisons in Toronto, Fort Frontenac, Quebec City, and Montreal, where on 19 June 1751, he was examined by Governor La Jonquiere and his council at Château Vaudreuil. Patten kept a journal of his experiences while imprisoned.

In response to a letter from New York Governor George Clinton, Governor La Jonquiere stated in August 1751 that "John Pathin might have enjoyed...liberty, but he is so mutinous, and made such menaces, that I was obliged to send him to prison in Quebec." In November 1751, Patten and two other traders arrested in Ohio (Luke Erwin and Thomas Bourke, employees of George Croghan) were sent to a prison in La Rochelle, France. In February 1752, they were all released through the help of Willem van Keppel, 2nd Earl of Albemarle, the British Ambassador in Paris. The ambassador demanded "the restitution of their effects that had been unjustly taken from them," paid for Patten's passage to Paris, and from there to London, where on March 8, 1752, he reported on his captivity to Robert Darcy, 4th Earl of Holderness, Secretary of State for the Southern Department. While in London he met with Thomas Penn, who was at that time the chief proprietor of Pennsylvania. He then returned to Philadelphia, where he made a deposition describing his experiences to the Pennsylvania Provincial Assembly on October 17, 1752. Patten reported that the trade goods, furs and skins, a dozen horses, and other items taken from him were worth £950, and the Assembly voted to give him £30 as "relief".

Patten later sent copies of his report to William Shirley, Governor of Massachusetts, probably after meeting him in 1753, and to Dr. William Clarke, a Boston physician, who wrote about the report to Benjamin Franklin.

=== Map of the Ohio Country ===
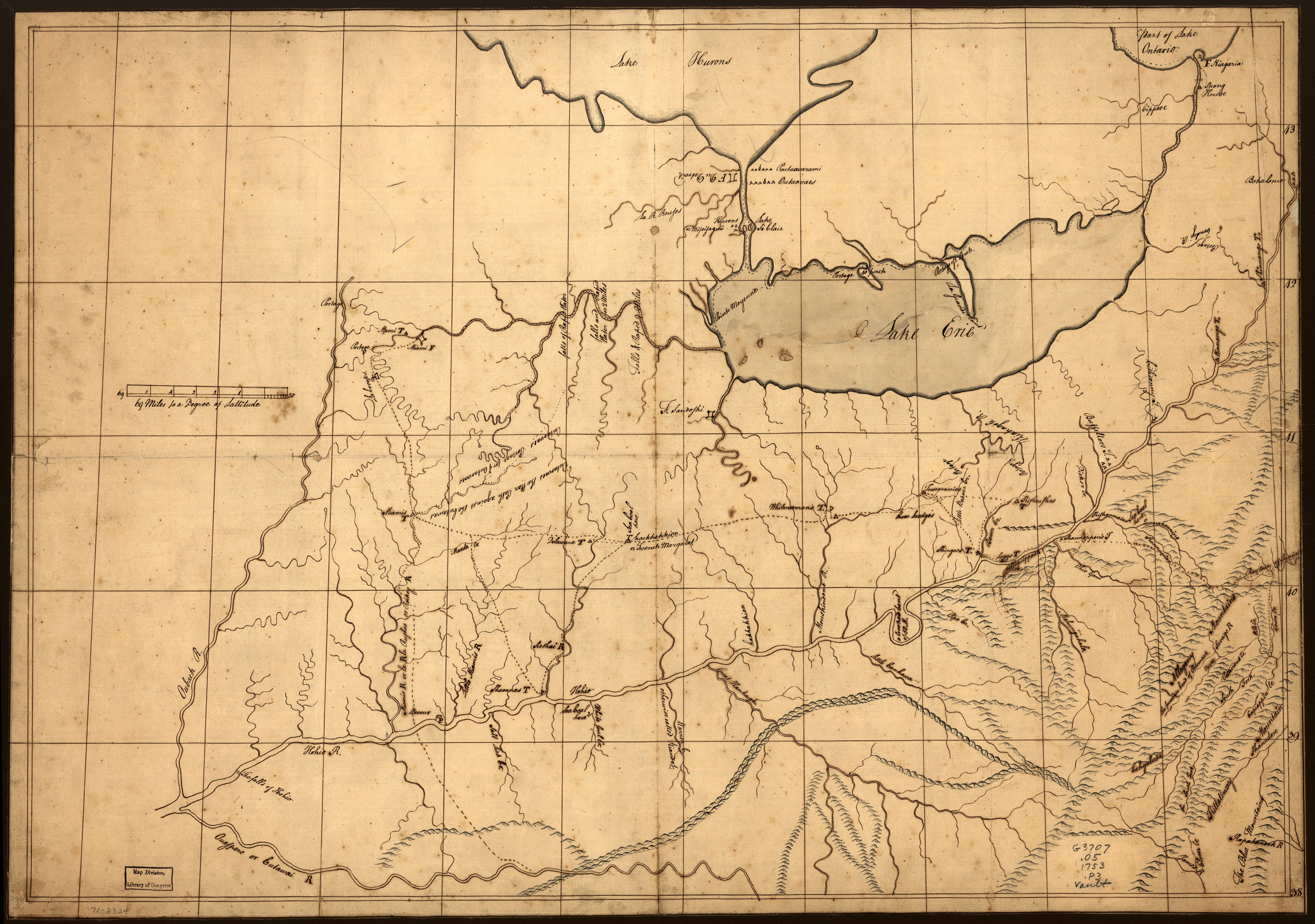
Trader's Map of the Ohio Country before 1753, believed to have been drawn by John Patten.

Records of a meeting of the Pennsylvania Provincial Assembly on January 15, 1753, show that they received "the account John Pattin gave of the several places in Canada through which he passed, when taken by the French, together with a map of that country, drawn by the said Pattin." Historian Howard Eavenson proposed in 1941 that the "Trader's Map of the Ohio Country before 1753" may in fact be the map submitted to the assembly. Patten's map was also probably the earliest one to identify coal deposits in Ohio and Pennsylvania.

Richard Peters wrote to Thomas Penn that:

"Having traded from Potomac several years, and being intimately acquainted with all the Waters, Passages and mountains between that River and the Lakes, [Patten] was persuaded to venture at a Plan of the Country, and when he brought it to me...I could not but approve it, and encouraged him to make three or four copies, which he did, leaving one for you, and one for the assembly and giving me one for my own private use...I recommend it to you as the most perfect Draught by far of your Western Bounds...Patten has learned to make an intelligent and tolerably neat Draught."

The one surviving copy of this map, now at the Library of Congress, is believed to be the one Patten kept for himself. Although the map was never formally printed or published, it is likely that Lewis Evans used it as a source for his 1755 "General Map of the Middle British Colonies in America," which shows the same coal deposits identified on Patten's map, which appear on no other maps of this period.

== First Arctic voyage, 1753 ==
In March 1753 Patten joined the crew of the Argo, where he served as a "draftsman and mineralist". The ship was a commercial vessel authorized to explore the coast of Labrador in search of the Northwest Passage, and had received funding from Benjamin Franklin. Captain Charles Swaine hoped to win the £20,000 reward offered for the successful discovery of a Northwest Passage from the Atlantic to the Pacific. Patten's experience as a fur trader was also relevant, as Swaine hoped to establish trade relations with indigenous communities in order to obtain furs.

Finding their route blocked by ice at Resolution Island, they mapped the Labrador coastline, uncovering fishing spots and copper deposits before returning to Philadelphia in November. The Pennsylvania Gazette reported that "we hear they have made a very good Chart, and have a better Account of the Country, its Soil, Produce, &c, than has hitherto been published." Patten sent his map to Benjamin Franklin, after which it was lost.

== Visit to Logstown, 1754 ==
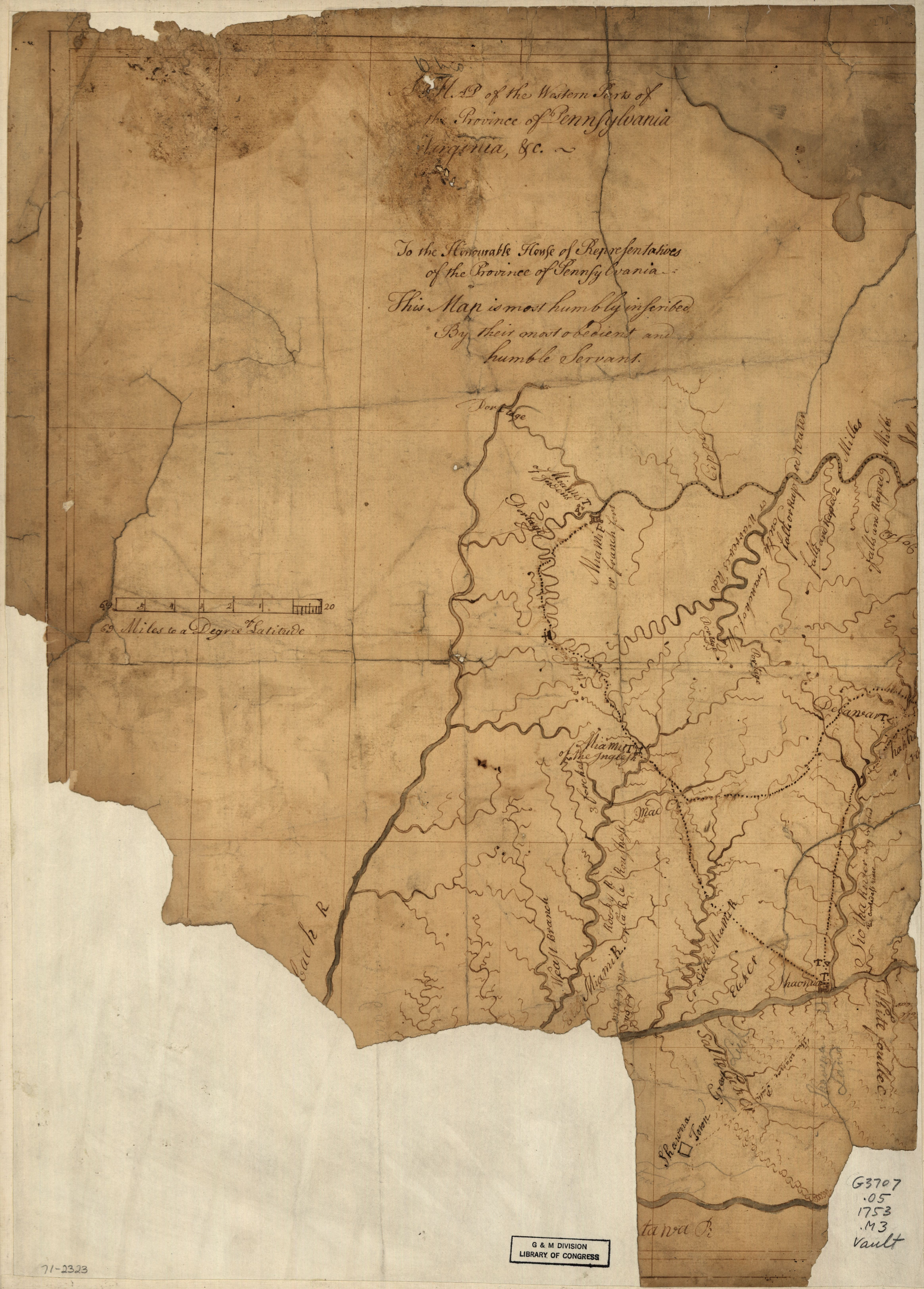
1753 map of Ohio, by John Patten.

In December 1753 Patten met with Governor James Hamilton, who asked him to accompany two Shawnee warriors, who had been released from captivity among the Catawba, to their home in the Ohio Country. This was a cover for a clandestine mission to the Ohio country for the purpose of investigating French military preparations and mapping the area. Hamilton's instructions include: "You are likewise to take a particular Account of the Road from Carlisle, so as to know how far Westward Shanoppin is from thence...and how far the French Forts are from Lake Erie or from the Straits of Niagara." Patten was to make the journey in the company of George Croghan and Andrew Montour, who were more experienced and spoke several Native American languages.

Hamilton also ordered Patten to take a message to the Native American leaders at Logstown, however when they arrived on January 14, 1754, they found most of the adults drunk on brandy sent to them by the French. Patten was disliked by Croghan and Montour, but they succeeded in mapping the Ohio Country and observing the movement of French troops. Croghan wrote to Richard Peters that "Mr. Patten, to my opinion, is very much Bigotted of himself; he and Androw Montour dose nott agree well." Patten reported that "Croghan had at all times persuaded the Indians to destroy the French," and that "self-interest was his sole motive in every thing he did...[as he tried] to engross the whole trade."

On January 15, 1754, the Oneida leader Tanacharison returned to Logstown from a journey with George Washington to Fort LeBoeuf, escorted by a French detachment under Ensign Michel Maray de La Chauvignerie which set up a temporary post nearby. Patten and Croghan had arrived in Logstown the day before, and observed the arrival of the French troops, "an Ensign, a Sergeant, and Fifteen Soldiers." On January 16, as Patten was walking around the town, the French commandant ordered him to be arrested. Tanacharison, Montour, and Croghan protested vigorously, and during the dispute, Tanacharison knocked the French commandant down, telling Patten: "You are a free man, I discharge you, go about your business." Patten was released. Seeing that the Native residents of Logstown, most of whom were intoxicated, were angry, the French detachment left the town and camped elsewhere.

Just before they left on February 2, Tanacharison and Shingas gave Patten three strings of black wampum with a message to the governors of Pennsylvania and Virginia pleading for English military protection from the French. Patten and Montour returned to Philadelphia early in March 1754, and Patten presented the Pennsylvania legislature with his diary of the mission and a map. Patten was paid £50. Patten produced a reasonably accurate map, which was presented to "the Honourable House of Representatives of the Province of Pennsylvania." Only part of the western half of this map has survived. Patten's map was accompanied by a list of estimated distances between communities in western Pennsylvania, which were used in creating additional maps. Benjamin Franklin and other members of the Pennsylvania Provincial Assembly used Patten's measurements to determine the line which divided French territory from British territory, a necessary calculation leading up to the French and Indian War.

== Final Arctic voyage, 1754 ==
Soon after his return from the Ohio Country, Patten embarked on a second Arctic exploration trip aboard the Argo, which departed on May 2. At some point during the trip (the exact date is not recorded), according to the ship's captain, "John Patten...with two of the sailors, were killed by the Indians, being on an Island some distance from the Schooner, fishing." A second report does not mention Patten by name, but says that he and two others were killed by Inuit after leaving the ship to search secretly for quartz deposits containing gold: "Three of the people who went beyond the place appointed by their orders, and inadvertently to look for a mine (samples of which had been carried home the year before)...were killed by Esquimaux."
