= Pickawillany =

Pickawillany Pinkwaawileniaki
- Historic Native American village
- Etymology: Unami: pekowiiøa "ash people"

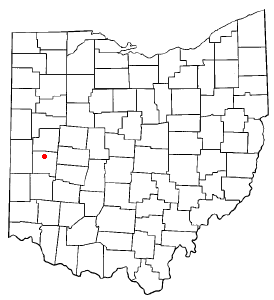
- Location of Pickawillany Village
- Coordinates: 40.1475°N 84.2481°W
- State: Ohio
- Present-day community: Piqua, Ohio
- County: Miami
- Founded: 1747
- Demolished: 21 June 1752

Population
  - Estimate (1750): 400 families (1,200–1,600 people)

Pickawillany (Miami-Illinois: Pinkwaawileniaki, also spelled Pickawillamy, Pickawillani, or Picqualinni) was an 18th-century Myaamiaki village located on the Great Miami River in North America's Ohio Valley near the modern city of Piqua, Ohio. In 1749 an English trading post was established alongside the Miami village, selling goods to neighboring tribes at the site. In 1750, a stockade (Fort Pickawillany) was constructed to protect the post. French and English colonists were competing for control of the fur trade in the Ohio Country as part of their overall struggle for dominance in North America. In less than five years, Pickawillany grew to be one of the largest Native American communities in eastern North America.

The French decided to punish Miami chief Memeskia (also known as La Demoiselle or Old Briton), for rejecting the French alliance and dealing with the English traders, which threatened what had previously been a French monopoly over local commerce. On 21 June 1752, the village and trading post were destroyed in the raid on Pickawillany, also known as the Battle of Pickawillany, when French-allied Indians attacked the village, killing Memeskia and at least one English trader and burning the English stockade and the trading post. Following the attack, the village of Pickawillany was relocated about a mile to the southeast. The city of Piqua, Ohio, was established later near this site.

Pickawillany's destruction directly encouraged greater British fortification and military presence at other outposts in the Ohio Valley, and has been seen as a precursor to the wider British-French conflict that would become the French and Indian War.

== Etymology ==
The English term Pickawillany derives from pkiiwileni, the Shawnee word for the Miami people – literally, "foreigner". The Miami name for the village (Pinkwaawileniaki) is a direct translation of the Shawnee pekowiiθa or "ash people."

== Establishment and early history ==
In the two decades preceding the French and Indian War, France struggled to maintain military and economic control of the Ohio Country, which was strategically crucial to lines of supply and communication between Canada and Louisiana. French dominance largely depended on the continued favorable relations between the government of New France and the Native American tribes living in the region, primarily the Miamis (Twightwees), the Wyandots (Hurons), and the Shawnees. English traders from Pennsylvania were able to supply cheaper goods in larger quantities than the French traders could, attracting a greater share of the fur trade and influencing many Ohio tribes to shift their alliance to the English.

In 1739 the Huron leader Orontony relocated his community from Detroit to Junundat and became openly hostile towards the French. In 1747 a combined force of Huron and Miami Indians attacked French outposts including Fort St. Philippe (Fort Miami), which was destroyed. The French forced the Wyandots to abandon Junundat in that year, but they were then faced with the growing influence of the newly-founded Miami community of Pickawillany, under the leadership of Memeskia, a Piankeshaw war chief. Memeskia had gained influence over many in the Miami tribe by encouraging a stronger trade relationship with the English rather than the French. The Miami elder Cold Foot had maintained loyalty to the French for many years, but English goods were cheaper and more readily available than those of the French, leading many tribes to settle closer to English trading posts.

In late 1747 Memeskia led a group of Miami Indians about 100 miles (160 km) to the southeast from their community at Kekionga on the Maumee River, to settle Pickawillany on the west bank of the Great Miami River, opposite the mouth of what was later named Loramie Creek. The village was at the convergence of several trading trails in western Ohio, giving it unusual influence over trade in the region. In addition, it was the southern terminus of three key portages (overland carrying places between rivers) that provided access between the Ohio/Great Miami River systems and Lake Erie and other points to the north and west. Traveling by water from the east and the headwaters of the Ohio River toward the western Great Lakes, it would have been almost a necessity to pass through Pickawillany to get from one region to the other. Pickawillany was near enough to the Potawatomi, Kickapoo, Illinois, and other tribes for trade, and accessible to the English traders of Pennsylvania and Virginia. Its location was a threat to the French, as it was easily accessible by many tribes allied to the French, and brought English traders far into territory the French considered theirs. However, it was also deep in Ohio Country, too far from English colonial territory to expect military assistance if attacked.

William Trent states that

the Miamis had a village on the west side of the Great Miami river, at the mouth of what afterward became known as Loramies creek. That point was visited by the coureurs des bois at an early day, and had become a place of note long previous to the alliance of the Miamis with the English. From the latter it received the name of "Tawixtwi town", until the building of a stockade, when it was called Pickawillany, although in some accounts we find the name "Picktown" applied to it.

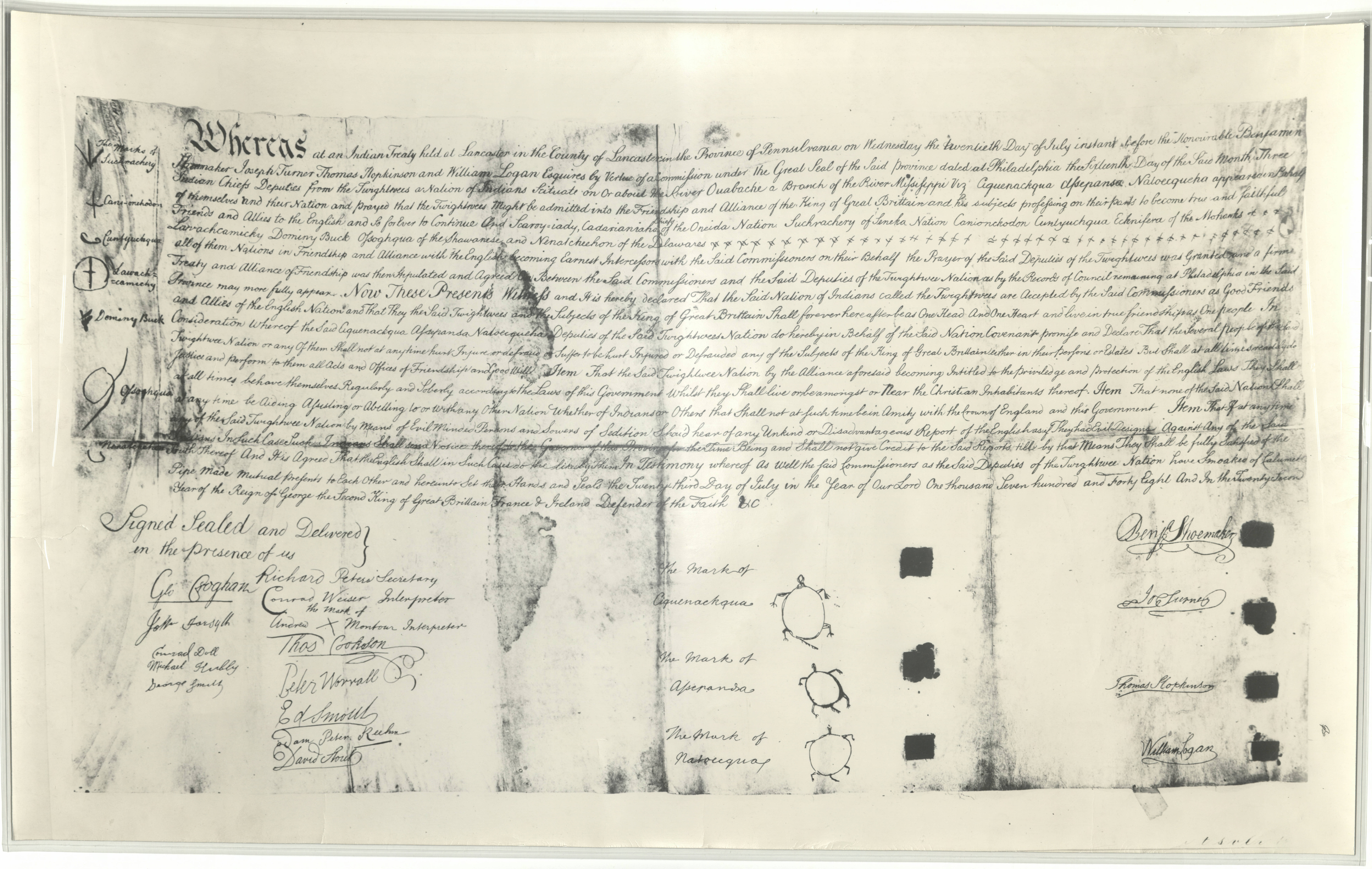
The 1748 Treaty of Lancaster between the Miami People and representatives of the Pennsylvania Provincial Council. The treaty was signed by George Croghan, Andrew Montour, Richard Peters, Conrad Weiser, and three Miami chiefs.

In July 1748, fifty-five representatives of the Six Nations, Delawares, Shawnees, Nanticokes, and Twightwees met at the courthouse in Lancaster, Pennsylvania and signed a peace treaty with the Pennsylvania Provincial Council. This treaty guaranteed commercial access to tribes across the Ohio Valley as far west as the Wabash River, an unprecedented diplomatic achievement for the English. The Indian leaders promised to try to persuade other Ohio communities to leave the French and join a pro-English alliance.

== Visit by Céloron de Blainville, 1749 ==
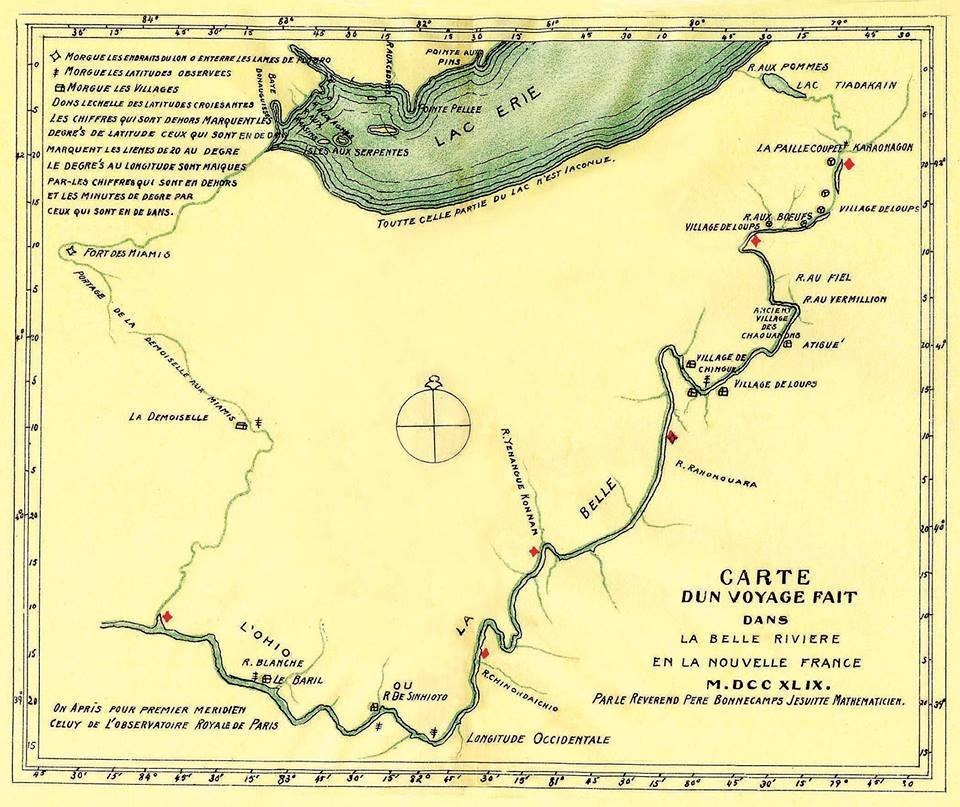
Map of the route followed by Pierre Joseph Céloron de Blainville along the Ohio River in 1749, drawn by Joseph Pierre de Bonnecamps. "La Demoiselle" (Pickawillany) appears on the left hand side.

In response to these new English alliances, the Governor of New France, Charles de la Boische, Marquis de Beauharnois decided to send a military force down the Ohio River to persuade and intimidate the main Native American communities to remain loyal to France. In mid-1749 Pierre Joseph Céloron de Blainville, leading a force of eight officers, six cadets, an armorer, 20 soldiers, 180 Canadians, 30 Iroquois and 25 Abenakis, moved down the Ohio River on a flotilla of 23 large boats and birch-bark canoes, on his "lead plate expedition," burying lead plates at six locations where major tributaries entered the Ohio. The plates were inscribed to claim the area for France. Céloron also sought out English traders and warned them to leave this territory which belonged to France.

After visiting Kittanning, Logstown and Lower Shawneetown and receiving a cool response, Céloron's party traveled up the Great Miami River (which Bonnecamps referred to as the "rocky river", Rivière a la Roche) to Pickawillany, arriving there on 13 September. Céloron immediately found two "English soldiers" living in Pickawillany and sent them away. (Note: Trent says several English traders were living in the town but fled before Céloron arrived.) Of the Miami living in Pickawillany, Father Bonnecamps remarks, "This band is not numerous; it consists at most of 40 or 50 men."

Céloron does not mention a confrontation that took place when he and his party approached the village. According to William Trent, warriors opened fire on the Frenchmen, killing three soldiers. A Twightwee leader called the Mad Captain by the British then invited the Frenchmen to attack, but when they refused, the Mad Captain "pulled off his breechclout & slapped Monsieur Céloron across the face and told him he was an old woman."

Céloron's party spent a week camped outside the town. He wanted to persuade Memeskia to lead his people back to Kekionga, and some of the Miamis said they "had not much objection". At one point he proposed that the Miamis accompany his party north to Detroit, emphasizing that the English could not be trusted. Céloron dispensed the last of his trade goods to the Miamis, with promises of much more if the Miamis would declare loyalty to the French and return to Kekionga. Memeskia promised to return the following spring, "for the season is too far advanced." After this, Memeskia refused to meet with him again, and instead Céloron met with other Miami leaders who then sent messages to Memeskia.

On 20 September, Céloron gave up, burned his canoes and set off with his party overland to Detroit. On the way, he stopped at Kekionga and met with Chief Cold Foot, telling him that Memeskia had made a vague promise to return to the French. Cold Foot told Céloron that "La Demoiselle is a liar. It is the source of all my grief to be the only one who loves you, and to see all the nations of the south let loose against the French." Céloron later remarked, speaking in general about his journey, that "the nations of these localities are very badly disposed towards the French, and are entirely devoted to the English."

== Fort and trading post, 1749-1750 ==
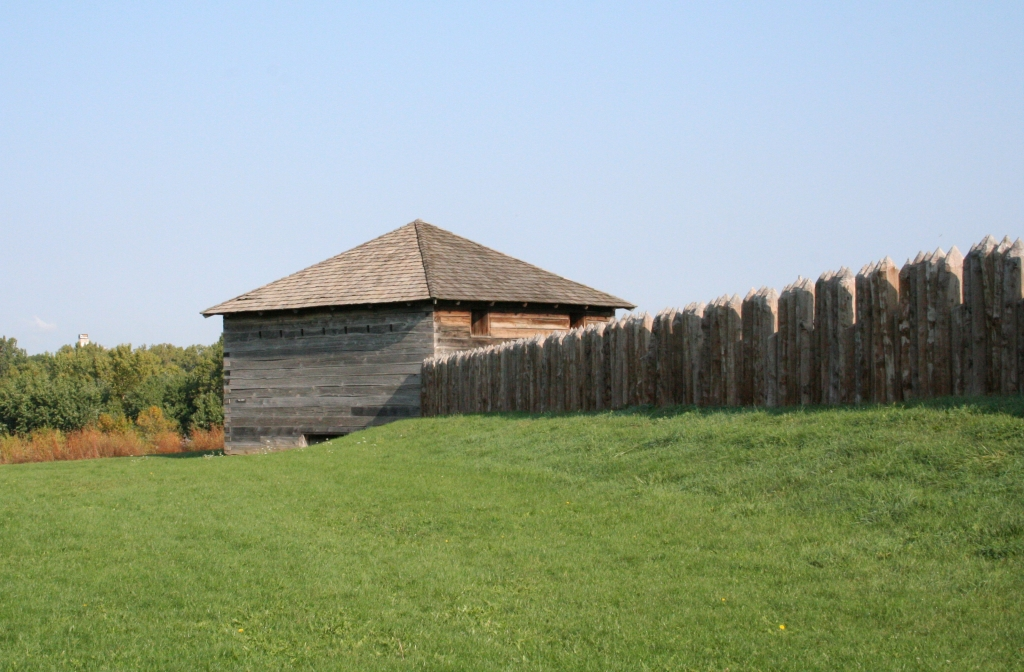
Reconstructed blockhouse and stockade similar in appearance to the fort at Pickawillany.

In November 1749, George Croghan, an Irish trader and Pennsylvania Indian agent, established a trading post alongside the village. According to a letter from Governor Robert Dinwiddie, when the French learned that Croghan had established a trading post at Pickawillany, they offered a price for Croghan's capture or for his scalp:

Two Prisoners who had been taken by the French, and had made their Escape from the French Officer at Lake Erie ... brought News that the French offered a large sum of Money to any person who would bring them the said Croghan and Andrew Montour the Interpreter alive, or if dead their scalps.

In late 1750, the Pennsylvania Provincial Council sent gifts to the people of Pickawillany and requested permission to build a "strong house", a fortified enclosure designed to withstand attack, but technically not a fortress, as the pacifist Philadelphia Quakers felt that they could not ethically finance any military structures. Nonetheless, this building was referred to by everyone else as "Fort Pickawillany." William Trent describes the fort's construction in 1750:

Having obtained permission from the Indians, the English, in the fall of 1750, began the erection of a stockade, as a place of protection, in case of sudden attack, both for their persons and property. When the main building was completed, it was surrounded with a high wall of split logs, having three gateways. Within the inclosure the traders dug a well, which furnished an abundant supply of fresh water during the fall, winter, and spring, but failed in summer. At this time Pickawillany contained four hundred Indian families, and was the residence of the principal chief of the Miami Confederacy.

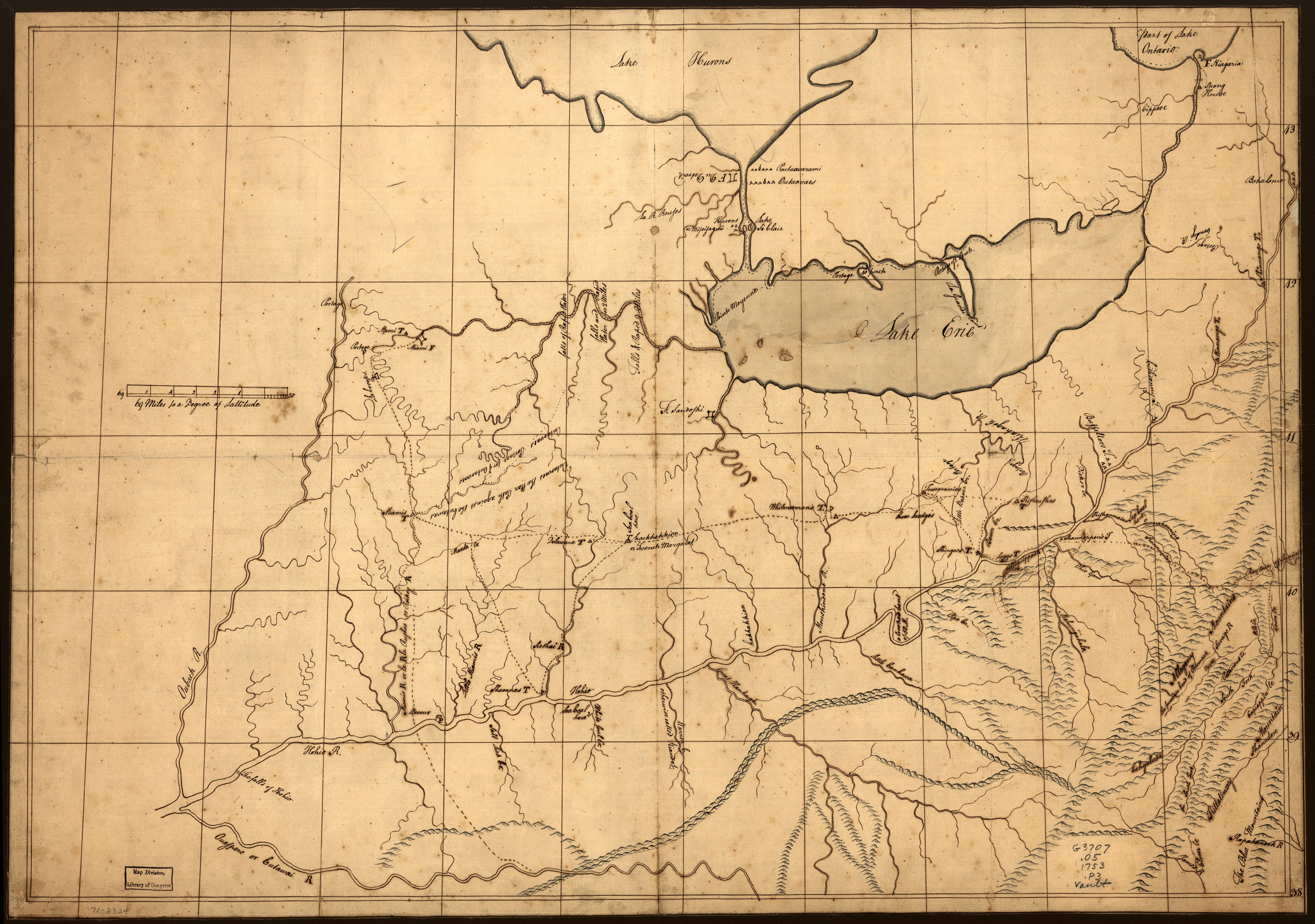
1752 trader's map of the Ohio Country drawn by John Patten, showing Pickawillany ("Miami T.") on the left side of the page, on the "Rocky R[iver]" at the confluence of Loramie Creek. Kekionga can be seen to the north, near Fort Miami.

With the security of a stockade fort, traders began building storehouses to contain their trade goods and to store the skins and furs they received in trade from the Indians. Trent describes these storehouses as

ordinary log cabins, the trading being carried on below, while an "upper storey" or "loft" was used as a place to store away skins and combustible material ... The articles of traffic on the part of the whites were firearms, gunpowder, lead, ball, knives, rings, rum, medals, hatchets, flints, blades, cooking utensils, shirts and other articles of wearing apparel, tobacco pipes, paint, etc .... Some of the traders would run regular "caravans" of fifteen or twenty horses, making several trips during the year.

The presence of a fort and a trading post attracted many English traders to the village seeking a new source of skins and furs. Hunters from many nearby communities began visiting Pickawillany regularly to trade, and the accumulation of European trade goods gave Memeskia increased influence over neighboring tribes, as he could strengthen alliances through gift-giving, a standard Native American practice. The French became increasingly concerned that the Miamis were considering "a general revolt against the French in pursuance of their plan of making themselves masters of all the upcountry."

== Visit by John Patten, 1750 ==
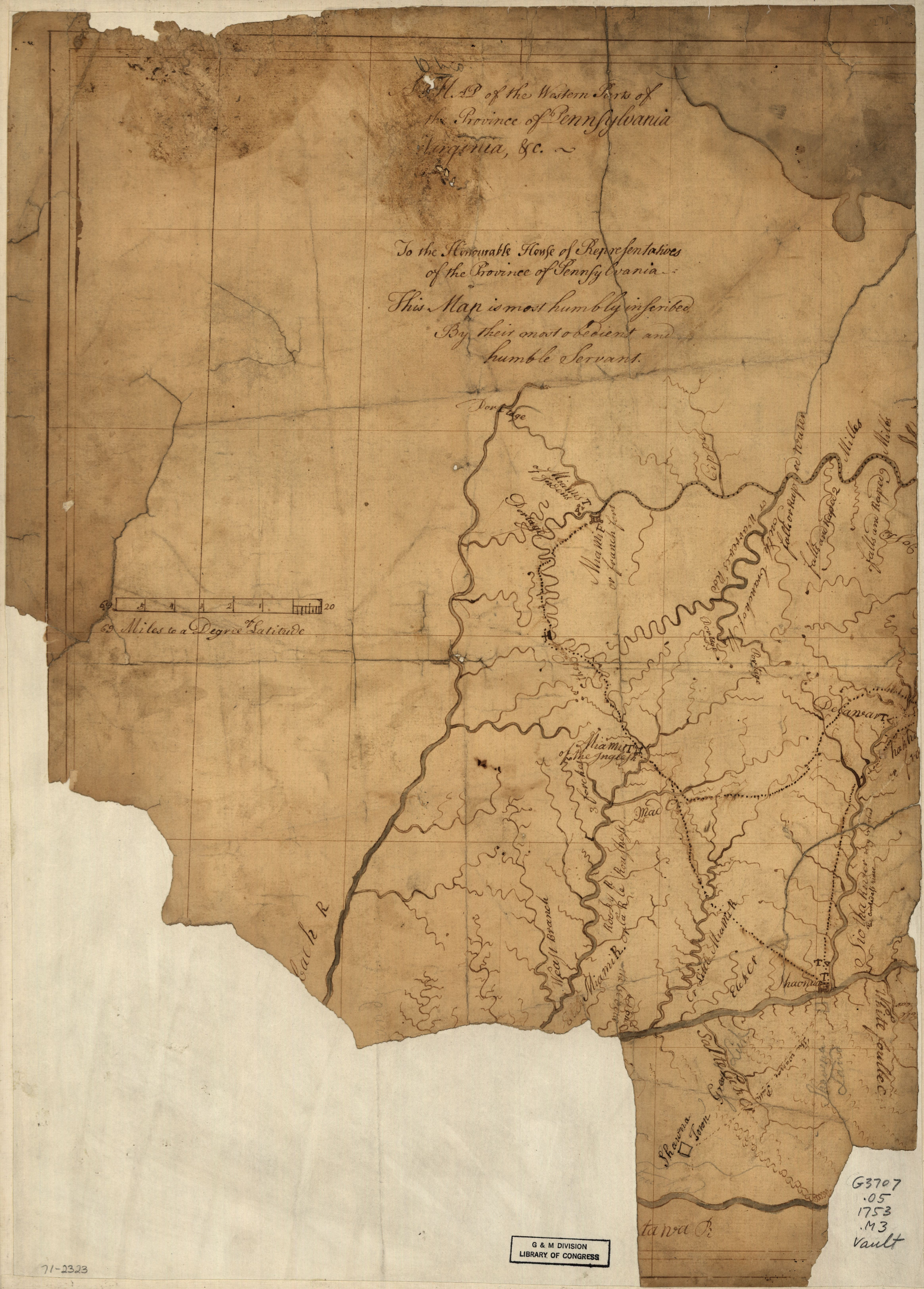
1753 map of Ohio, by John Patten, showing "Miami of the Inglish" (Pickawillany) on the "Rocky R[iver]" just below the center of the page.

In November 1750 John Patten, a Pennsylvania fur trader, stopped at Pickawillany on his way to trade with Native communities on the St. Marys River. While trading with the Indians, Patten was invited to Fort St. Philippe, where he was arrested and his goods confiscated. He was later taken to Quebec and examined by Governor La Jonquiere and his Council at Château Vaudreuil in Montreal on 19 June 1751. Patten stated that at Pickawillany he "found upwards of fifty Traders, including servants, lodging in cabins belonging to the Miamis Indians; that the name of their chief was La Demoiselle; that those cabins were in a fort." Patten was then sent to France, and in 1752 was released through the help of friends, whereupon he returned to Pennsylvania.

In his deposition to the Pennsylvania Assembly on 17 October 1752, Patten referred to Pickawillany as "the Twightwee Town, which lies near the head of that Western branch of the Ohio called by the English, Miamis River." He reported that "this Miami Town was computed to have about 200 fighting men, all of the Twightwee Nation, settled therein, and are some of those who left the French seven or eight years ago [from 1752], in order to trade with the English."

== Visit by Christopher Gist, 1751 ==
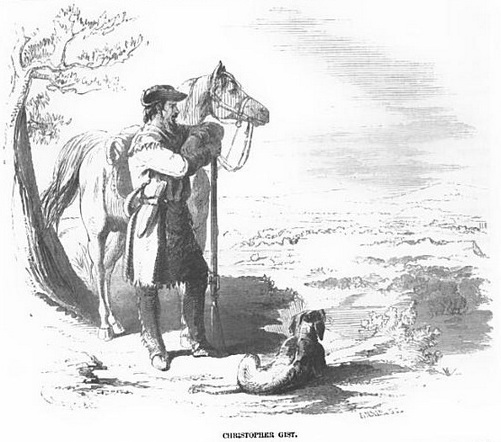
Explorer and surveyor Christopher Gist (1706-1759) produced one of the most detailed descriptions of life in the Ohio Country.

Christopher Gist visited the town in February 1751, and reported:

This Town is situate on the NW Side of the Big Miamee River and about 100 M from the mouth thereof; it consists of about 400 Families and daily increasing it is one of the strongest Towns upon this part of the Continent ... The Land on the Great Miamee River is very rich level and well timbered, some of the finest Meadows that can be .... The Grass here grows to a great Height in the clear fields, of which there are a great number, & the Bottoms are full of white Clover, wild Rye and Blue Grass.

While he was there, four Ottawa Indians sent as emissaries by the French arrived, and a council was held with Memeskia. The Ottawas presented gifts and requested that Memeskia reconsider his alliance with the English. Croghan and Gist were present at the council, at which both the French and English flags were displayed. After hearing the French message, the speaker of the Miamis replied,

Brothers of the Ottaways, You are always differing with the French Yourselves, and yet you listen to what They say, but we will let you know by these four Strings of Wampum that We will not hear anything they Say to Us, nor do anything they Bid Us .... As You threaten Us with War in the Spring We tell You that if You are angry we are ready to receive You, and resolve to die here before We will go to You.

The next day the French flag was removed and the Ottawas were sent home. Gist and Croghan finalized a treaty of friendship with Memeskia: "We had Drawn Articles of Peace and Alliance between the English and the Wawaughtanneys and Pyankashees; the Indentures were signed and selad [sealed] and delivered on both sides." Leaders of Pickawillany were invited to attend a conference at Logstown in May 1751, where Croghan distributed gifts and further cemented the relationship between the English and the Ohio Valley Indian communities.

On 1 March, as Gist was preparing to leave Pickawillany, the speaker of the Miamis sent a message to Governor Dinwiddie, which began: "Brothers our Hearts are glad that you have taken notice of Us, and surely Brothers we hope that you will Order a Smith to settle here to mend our Guns and Hatchets." By mid-1752 a gunsmith (Thomas Burney) and a blacksmith were working at Pickawillany, employed by Croghan. Burney had previously established a forge at the Wyandot community of Muskingum, where Gist had met him in December 1750.

== French plans to attack Pickawillany ==
1755 map by John Mitchell showing "Pickawillany, 150 M[iles] from Ohio R.", to the left of map's center. To the left is printed, "English Ft. established in 1748, the extent of the English settlements."

Céloron de Blainville's failed attempt to persuade Memeskia to return to French loyalty led to the French decision to attack the village, as a punishment and a warning to other Native communities defecting to the English. Soon after Céloron's return, reports of French military movements began to alarm English colonial authorities. In July 1751, reports reached New York governor George Clinton that a French force of "twelve Hundred French & Two Hundred of Orondacks passed by Oswego about a fortnight ago with a design to cut off (as I understand) some of the Nations of Indians to the Westward, who are Strongly attached to the British Interest, also to Stop the Philadelphians building at, or near Ohio." Benjamin Stoddert reported to Sir William Johnson that "two hundred Orondack Indians under the command of Monsieur Belletre and Chevalier Longville ... design against a village of the Twightwees where the English are building a trading-house." Two escaped English prisoners, Morris Turner and Ralph Kilgore, reported to Governor Dinwiddie "that in the Spring an army of five hundred Frenchmen would march to Ohio, and either bring back the Shawnees and Owendats (Wyandots) or kill them." In fact, French troops and Ottawa warriors under the command of Céloron de Blainville assembled at Detroit, but the Indians complained that the force did not have sufficient strength to attack Pickawillany and refused to proceed.

In late 1751, François-Marie Picoté de Belestre led a raiding party of seventeen warriors to Pickawillany, but found the town nearly deserted, as most of the population was away hunting. They captured two English traders and killed a Miami man and a woman. In response, Memeskia had three captured French soldiers killed, cut off the ears of a fourth prisoner, and sent him back to Canada as a warning to the Governor of New France.

The Governor General of New France, Jacques-Pierre de Taffanel de la Jonquière, immediately began preparing another attack on Pickawillany, but plans were incomplete when he died on 17 March 1752. His successor, Charles III Le Moyne, Baron de Longueuil, worked unsuccessfully to put together a force of French troops and Indian warriors to attack the town again. The French were unable to persuade Ottawa leaders to launch an attack on Pickawillany, even though spies reported on the numbers of fighting men and defenses of the town: "They are 140 men, the others eighty, and have but two English among them without cannon or artillery."

On 23 May 1752, Lieutenant John Mills wrote to Pennsylvania Governor James Hamilton to inform him "By some foreign Indians, just arrived, I am told that ... [Monsieur St. Orr, a French officer] is gone back to Canada to conduct an Army back, to be employed against them [the Twightwees]." Hamilton was skeptical, but in any case did not have the power to send assistance to the Miami Indians at Pickawillany without the approval of the Pennsylvania Provincial Council, and no action was taken.

== Raid on Pickawillany, 1752 ==
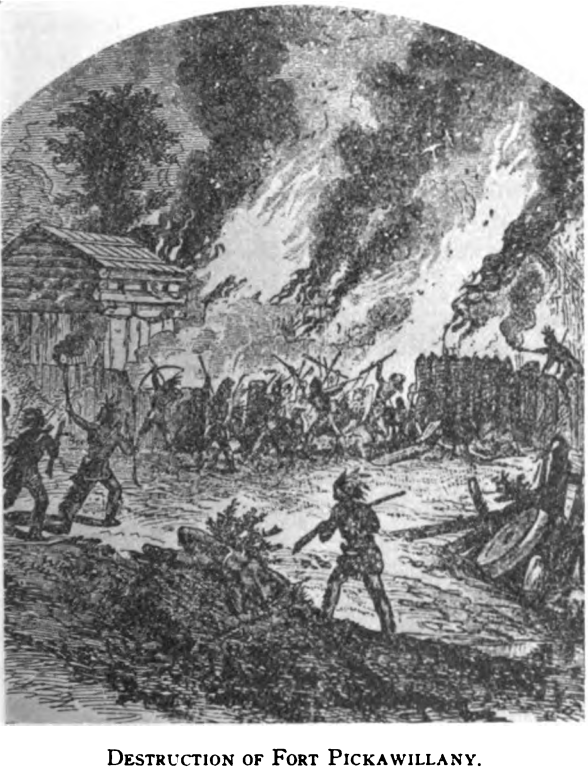

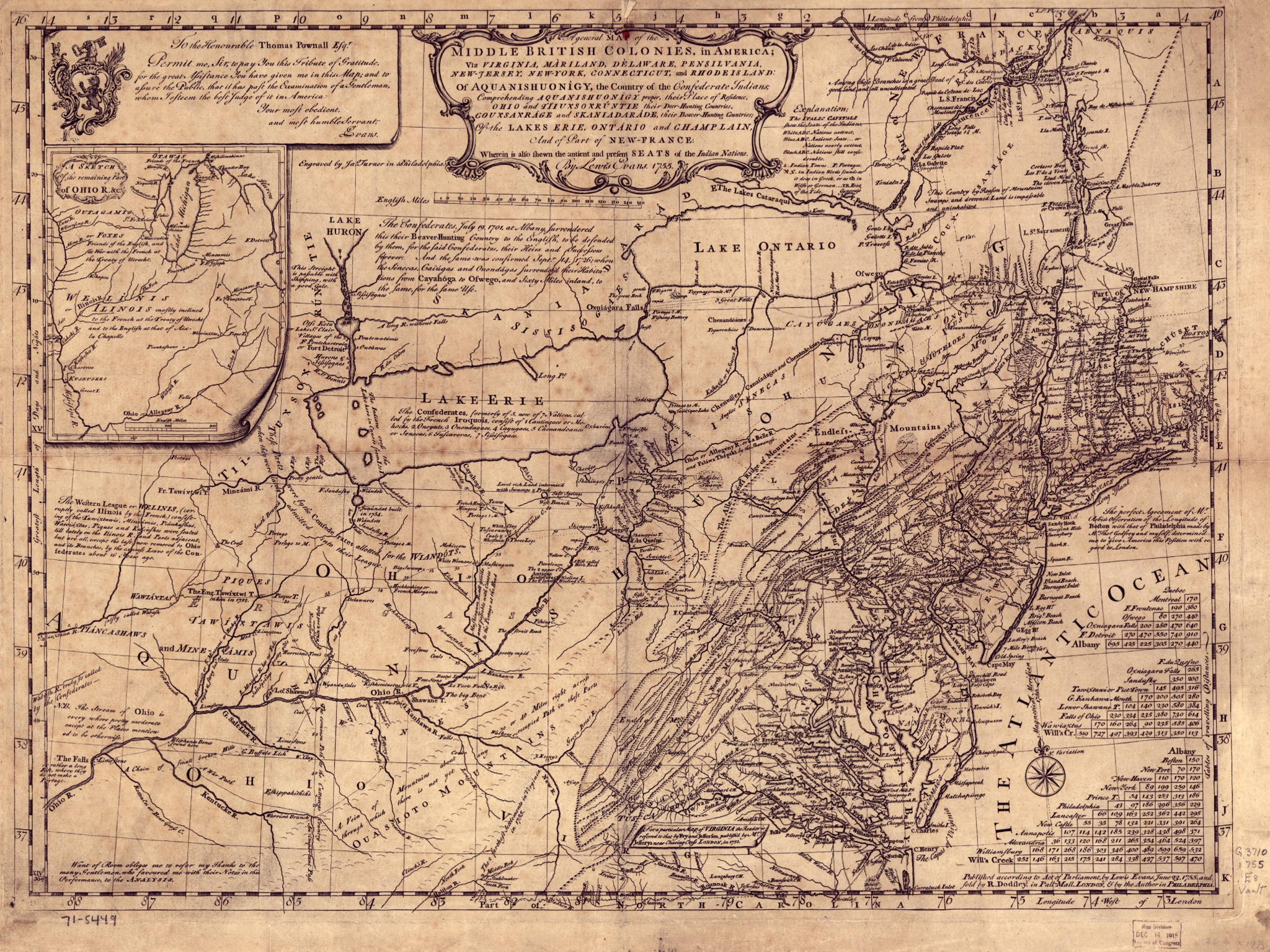
1755 map by Lewis Evans showing "The Eng[lish] Tawixtwi T. taken in 1752" to the lower left of map's center. Slightly to the right is "Pique T.", the relocated village, where Piqua, Ohio is located today.

In the winter of 1751–1752, Charles Michel de Langlade, a 23-year-old Métis coureur de bois seeking to advance his military career, began assembling a war party of French-allied Ottawa, Potawatomi, and Ojibwe warriors, traveling as far as Saginaw Bay to enlist the support of Ottawa there. Langlade knew that the Governor of New France had been trying to implement a plan to attack and destroy the village, but that he had been unable to recruit Indian warriors. Langlade was well-connected to the Ottawa (his maternal grandfather was Nissowaquet, an Ottawa war chief), and spoke the Odawa dialect fluently. He was able to persuade Ottawa warriors to attack Pickawillany by characterizing the raid as a gesture of friendship towards Onontio, the French governor. Langlade's plan to attack Pickawillany was carried out without the knowledge of the Canadian government. At the time of the raid he was only a cadet in the colonial regulars, and held no official rank.

On 7 June, Langlade and a force of 272 Ottawa reached Detroit, where about 30 of the Indians deserted, having heard that there was a smallpox epidemic among the Miamis. The Miamis later alleged that thirty French soldiers accompanied the Indians but did not take part in the raid.

Early on the morning of 21 June 1752, Langlade arrived at the village with 240 Indians and one other unidentified Frenchman. They lay in wait until most of the village's population was outside the fort or working in the cornfields. Launching their attack at about 9 a.m., the warriors killed 13 Miami men and captured four women. About twenty men and boys, including five English traders, took refuge in the fort, but three traders locked themselves in a cabin, and although they had guns and ammunition, were too frightened to open fire, and were eventually captured. The attackers negotiated terms of surrender with those inside the fort, presenting wampum belts as a token of good faith and promising that if they gave up the traders, the attackers would return the four captured Miami women, take the traders and leave. As they were heavily outnumbered and had no water, the fort's well having gone dry, the Miamis decided to hand over three of the five English traders, one of whom (a blacksmith) was badly injured from a gunshot wound to his abdomen. The Ottawas killed this man, cut out his heart and ate it in front of the Miami men, to atone for the death of Ottawa warriors killed in the attack. Among Algonquian and Iroquoian peoples, the hearts of the victims were often devoured to add the power of the deceased to whoever consumed them. Two other traders, gunsmith Thomas Burney and Andrew McBryer, "whom the Indians hid," escaped with the help of the Miamis, fled "during the night" and made their way to Lower Shawneetown.

Langlade's men then seized the Miami chief Memeskia, and he was killed, boiled and eaten "within a hundred yards of the fort" in front of his Miami men. This act represented a symbolic re-incorporation of Memeskia into the French alliance. One source reports that they killed two more of the English traders. Afterward the Ottawa released the Miami women, as well as Memeskia's wife and son, burned the English stockade and the trading post and left for Detroit with the captured Englishmen and £3000 worth of trade goods (more than $300,000 worth in today's dollars).

The trader William Ives passed by the town the next night and reported later to William Trent that "the white men's houses were all on fire, and that he heard no noise in the Fort," although there was one gunshot and someone calling out. Trent met Thomas Burney and Andrew McBrey at Lower Shawneetown on 6 July and questioned them about the raid. At Lower Shawneetown on 29 July, Trent met "the young Pianguisha king, Musheguanockque, or the Turtle, two more men, Old Britain's wife and son, with about a dozen women and their children." Trent refers to Memeskia's son as Ellonagoa Pyangeacha.

=== Contemporary accounts of the raid ===
Thomas Hutchins' map of Virginia, Pennsylvania, Maryland, and North Carolina shows "The English Tawixtwi or Pique Town, taken in 1752 by the French," to the upper right of map's center.

Various contemporary sources report widely differing numbers of casualties and prisoners, in addition to other details. Thomas Burney is the principal source for the English accounts; William Trent based his statements on what he learned when he spoke to Burney and Andrew McBrey in Lower Shawneetown (it is not known how much McBrey contributed to the narrative). Newspaper articles published in late 1752 are based on statements by Burney or Trent, as are letters from Governor Dinwiddie and other Pennsylvania leaders. A brief statement made by five English traders who were captured (some accounts list only four) was made in a deposition on 2 February 1753.

French accounts are probably based heavily on Langlade's reports, together with some information from Indians who accompanied him. Langlade sent his journal, in which he described the raid, to the Marquis Duquesne, however it has been lost. Interestingly, Langlade's memoir, published in 1876 and based on recollections of Langlade's grandson, does not mention the raid.

=== English accounts ===
William Trent, in his journal, makes no mention of Langlade, but instead states that the attack was led by a "Monsieur St. Orr, afterward distinguished in the French and Indian war." St. Orr had been selected to lead the raid but was unable to persuade the Ottawa and Ojibwe Indians to accompany him.

Thomas Burney, one of the two English survivors, reported on the raid to Captain Robert Callender in Carlisle, Pennsylvania on 29 August, who in turn wrote to Governor Dinwiddie with the following statement:

Last night, Thomas Burney, who lately resided at the Twightwees' town in Allegheny, came here and gives the following account of the unhappy affair that was lately transacted there: On the twenty-first day of June last, early in the morning, two Frenchmen and about two hundred and forty Indians came to the Twightwees' town, and in a hostile manner attacked the people there residing. In the skirmish there was one white man and fourteen Indians killed, and five white men taken prisoners.

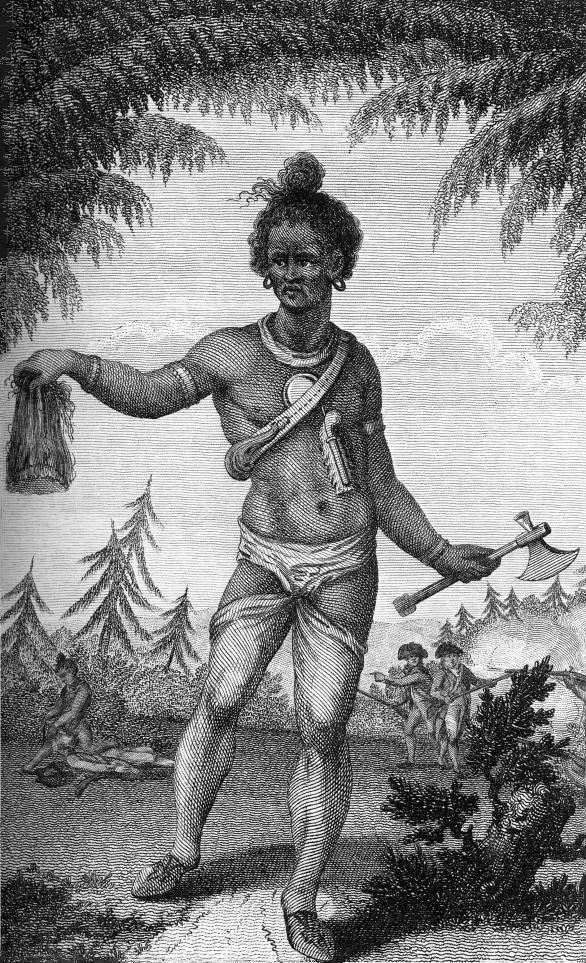
Indian warrior with scalp, 1789. From Travels through the interior parts of America in a series of letters, by Thomas Anburey, 1789.

Burney later presented a letter to Governor Dinwiddie, supposedly from the Miamis but probably written by Burney himself, describing the raid:

The French and French Indians ... engaged our Fort at a time when all our Warriors and briskest Men were out a hunting. They had two hundred and forty fighting Men, appeared suddenly, and took us on Surprize, when they had sent us Wampum and a fine French Coat in Token of Peace and good Will, just to deceive and draw our People out, and then fall on us, as a more weak and defenceless Part; being only twenty Men able to bear Arms, and nine of them were our Brothers, the English, who helped us much. But their Stores and Houses being on the outside of our Fort, our enemies plundered them, and took six of our Brothers', the English's, Goods, and, to our great Loss, their Powder and Lead; and killed one of them English, & scalped him. They kill'd our great Pianckosha King, whom we called Old Britain, for his great Love to his Brothers, the English ... There were but two French men appear'd among the Indians in Time of Battle, altho' we understand there were thirty men within two Miles of us, all the Time of Action, who were ready to receive their share of the Plunder.

The four existing newspaper articles (all from November, 1752) focus heavily on the "acts of barbarity" of the murder of captives, the mutilation of corpses, and the cannibalizing of an English trader and of Chief Memeskia. In one article, William Trent reported that the fingers of the dead British trader were cut off and kept by Langlade's warriors. The papers emphasize that counterattacks were in preparation by the Native American tribes allied with the English. The New York Gazette says that the "Six Nations have not yet declared war, but have called in all their warriors, and are making preparations." Mobilization of European troops would have been controversial and was not being contemplated. Newspapers reported that the Six Nations and allied Indians in the Ohio Country had taken a "solemn oath to eat every Frenchman they can lay their hands on, and not to leave a man, woman, or child of the Tawaw [Ottawa] Nation alive."

The five English traders captured at Pickawillany (Joseph Stevens, George Henry, John Evans, James Devoy, and Owen Nicholson) made the following statement in Philadelphia on 2 February 1753:

They were trading ... with the Five Indian Nations on the River Ohio ... when they were met, on the 22nd of June 1752, by a party of 170 Canada-French and some Indians, having a French officer at their head named Langlade who took these Declarants Prisoners. There were two other men of Philadelphia in Company with these Declarants, vizt. Andrew Browne and Alexander MacDonald, both whom the Indians of the French party kill'd by the Officer's order and cut off their Scalps. The French party seiz'd all the goods belonging to these Declarants ... Besides which the French kill'd 30 horses belonging to all five of them ... And these Declarants themselves were carried Prisoners to ... Quebec ... and were there thrown into a dark dungeon with only straw to lay upon.

=== French accounts ===
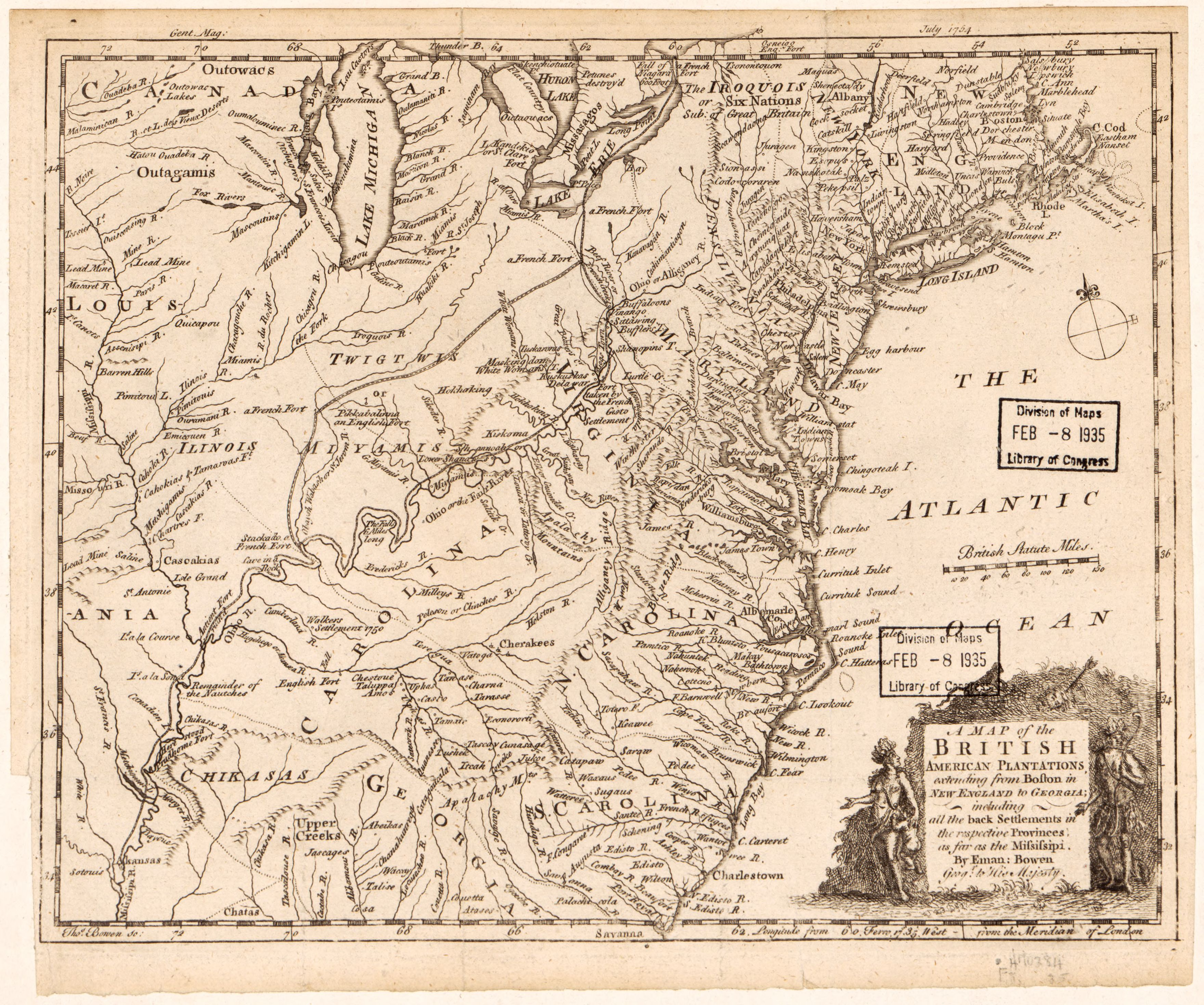
1754 map of British plantations in North America, showing "Pikkavalinna, an English Fort" on the G[reat] Miyamis R[iver] directly south of Lake Michigan.

A letter from The Baron de Longueuil on 18 August 1752, reports:

A party of about 210 savages of Missilimakinac attacked the Fort of La Demoiselle, who is dead; and they destroyed about 26; and the others asked for pardon ... I will add, My Lord, that among the number of savages who are reported to be killed there, were six English Traders, whose magazines were destroyed by our savages.

On 2 September 1752, Commandant Jean-Jacques de Macarty-Mactigue wrote to Pierre de Rigaud, Marquis de Vaudreuil-Cavagnial, describing the raid:

After the Ottawa attacked the Great Miami Village, the ... Ottawa, having captured four Miami women, proposed to give them up in exchange for the English. This the Miami did, giving up seven English, one of whom was wounded. These the Ottawa killed and pillaged. The Miami promised not to return and attack the Chippewa, saying, "I do not know how our father will act. We have lost many people and he is the cause. We do not say that we will not return.

François-Marie Le Marchand de Lignery wrote about the raid to Vaudreuil on 3 October 1752:

Toward the end of May, the Chippewa and Ottawa of Mackinac, to the number of two hundred men, attacked the Miami of Great Miami River. This blow was not of great account as they killed only five or six men. But what was better was their killing of three English and taking six prisoners after seizing their merchandise. Of the six, the Miami gave up four to them after the action, to get back four of their women who had been taken. One of these English was eaten by the Chippewa who had lost men ... But I would not venture to certify this last news, which I heard only from the Indians.

== Aftermath ==
Memeskia's wife and son were released by Langlade, and went to Lower Shawneetown, where Trent saw them on 29 July. The Pennsylvania Council later sent them gifts in condolence of the death of Memeskia. Langlade garnered significant fame and praise following the raid, and in 1755 was promoted to ensign and given a full military pension. He participated in (by his own account) 99 different military engagements during his lengthy career. Michel-Ange Duquesne de Menneville wrote of Langlade: "He is acknowledged here to be very brave, to have much influence on the minds of the Indians, and to be very zealous when ordered to do anything."

A month after the raid, William Trent visited the abandoned town, accompanied by Thomas Burney and 20 Indians, arriving on 20 July. They found French flags flying over the deserted fort, which they replaced with British flags, and Trent recovered a few trade goods that had been abandoned by the attackers. Following the attack, the Miami and English abandoned the site. The village of Pickawillany was relocated about two miles to the southwest. The city of Piqua, Ohio developed later near the Miami's second site of this village.

The five English traders who were captured, later stated that Langlade took them "to Quebec, and from thence sent them to La Rochelle, in Old France, where they were released by the English ambassador, and by him sent to London, from whence they got a passage to this place." Andrew McBryer, the second English survivor of the raid, was reported by one source to have been captured by French soldiers and Indians in late 1752. A second source says he was captured at Christopher Gist's settlement near Winchester, Virginia in 1754. In 1756 George Croghan, facing bankruptcy after the destruction of his trading posts at Pickawillany in 1752 and Lower Shawneetown in 1754, made an account of his losses, stating that at Pickawillany he lost goods amounting to 331 pounds and 15 shillings, which were "in the hands of Thomas Burney and Andrew McBryar."

By June 1753, Thomas Burney was operating a blacksmith's forge at Logstown. On 28 March 1754, he enlisted as a private in George Washington's regiment in the Virginia Militia and was employed briefly as a messenger. He served under Captain Andrew Lewis at the Battle of Fort Necessity in July 1754 and in November he applied for an officer's commission, which was denied. In a letter of 13 November 1754, from Governor Robert Dinwiddie to Maryland Governor Horatio Sharpe, Dinwiddie mentions that "The bearer hereof, Thos. Burney, lived some years among the Twightees [Miami], as a blacksmith." Burney was killed at the Battle of the Monongahela on 9 July 1755.

== Later history ==
The remains of Pickawillany may have been the site of a 1763 battle during the French and Indian War, described by Black Hoof to Colonel John Johnston:

In the French War ... a bloody battle was fought on the present farm of Colonel Johnston at Upper Piqua ... The Miamis, Wyandots, Ottawas and other northern tribes adhered to the French, made a stand here and fortified, the Canadian traders and French assisting. The Delawares, Shawanese, Munseys, part of the Senecas residing in Pennsylvania, Cherokees, Catawbas, etc., adhering to the English interest with the English traders, attacked the French and Indians. The siege continued for more than a week; the fort stood out and could not be taken. Many were slain, the assailants suffering most severely. The besieged lost a number, and all their exposed property was burnt and destroyed. The Shawnese chief, Black Hoof, one of the besiegers, informed Colonel Johnston that the ground around was strewn with bullets, so that basketfuls could have been gathered. Soon after this contest the Miamis and their allies left this part of the country ... and never returned.

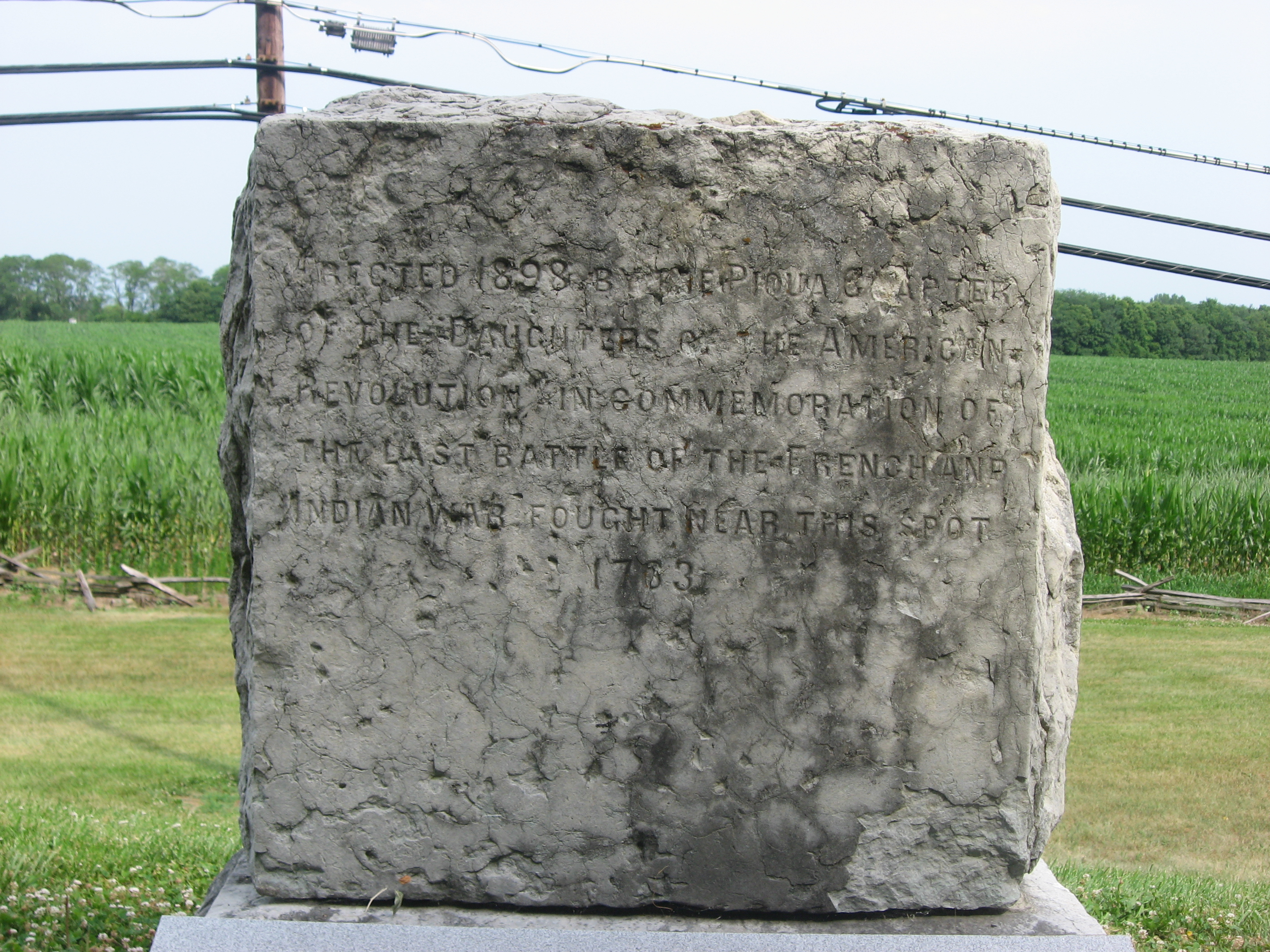
Historic marker at the site of the 1760s battle near the former location of Pickawillany.

A few years later, the French commander of the fort at Vincennes, Indiana, sent traders to establish a trading post on the site of Pickawillany. At the same time, the French made efforts to establish an alliance with the Miami Indians living in nearby Piqua, "lavishing upon them a very large amount of money and a great variety of costly presents." The post did not profit much, however, until 1769, when Pierre-Louis de Lorimier established a store there. Eventually a small community grew up around the store, known as "Loramie's Station". A branch of the Great Miami River on which the community stood was known as Loramie Creek. During the Illinois Campaign, in 1782, George Rogers Clark destroyed Loramie's Station as well as Piqua and several other Miami communities.

General Anthony Wayne built a small fort at the site of Pickawillany in the fall of 1794, but it was abandoned a year later after the signing of the Treaty of Greenville. Settlers moving west after the American Revolutionary War arrived in the area in 1798 and established a town called Washington. The name was changed to Piqua in 1823.

In August 1795, Chief Little Turtle (Michikinikwa), at Greeneville, Ohio, reportedly said, "You discovered on the Great Miami traces of an old fort. It was not a French fort, brother, it was a fort built by me." Historians believe this is an error in translation, and that he said "a fort built by Mishikinakwa (The Turtle)," the name of an early Miami leader (also written Musheguanockque) known to have been at Pickawillany, who escaped to Lower Shawneetown after the raid.

== Archeological investigations ==
Between 2002 and 2011, extensive work was done on a 37.5 acres (152,000 m^{2}) tract purchased by the State of Ohio in 1999, to be included in the Piqua Historical Area State Memorial and overseen by the Ohio Historical Society. The site has been actively farmed since the mid-19th century and no visible traces of Pickawillany remain.

Using remote sensing, magnetometer, electrical resistance and ground penetrating radar surveys, over 1500 artifacts have been recovered, including musket balls, lead scrap, small brass ornamental items called tinkler cones, brass arrow points, gunflints, and iron tools. Remote sensing data has located several sub-surface anomalies that may represent parts of building foundations, buried cellars and a well. The ongoing project is intended to identify the locations of important structures and activity areas.

Between 2009 and 2011 work centered on a number of large anomalies located within about 25 metres (82 ft) from one another that were identified during previous magnetometer surveys. These are all within an area where the data suggests that the English traders were active. Artifacts recovered in 2009 included a brass finger ring set with a faceted green glass stone, French style gunflints, brass arrow points (including a very rare stemmed type), a brass and iron hook about 40 inches (100 cm) long, a stone tobacco pipe, a number of glass and ceramic beads, and two butt plates from French muskets dated to between 1699 and 1745.

Of particular interest was the discovery of a blacksmith's hammer in 2011. Thomas Burney, one of the two English survivors of the raid, was a gunsmith, and the English trader whose heart was eaten by Ojibwe Indians was a blacksmith. Other ironmongery found at the site may have come from a trash pit near the blacksmith's shop.

Three iron axes stamped with the letter "B" have been found in the Upper Piqua area or in the vicinity of the Pickawillany site, turned up during farming activities over the years. The "B" stamp is unique to that local area since no other sources have been found which mention this particular mark. The fact that Thomas Burney practiced blacksmithing in the area and the unique presence of the stamp would suggest that Burney himself manufactured these axes.

== See also ==
- Charles Michel de Langlade
- Memeskia
- Miami people
- William Trent
