= Memeskia =

Piankashaw chieftain (died 1752)

Memeskia (Miami-Illinois: Meemeehšihkia 'Dragonfly', c. 1695 – June 21, 1752), known as "Old Briton" by the British and as "La Demoiselle" by the French, was an eighteenth-century Piankashaw chieftain who fought against the French in 1747. In November 1750, he signed a friendship treaty with the British Indian agent, George Croghan, which was cemented during a visit by Indian scout Christopher Gist in February 1751. He had acquired the nickname "La Demoiselle" from the French, which translates to 'young lady' or 'damselfly', but was supposedly a grandiloquent rendering of the meaning of meemeehšihkia, Miami-Illinois for 'dragonfly', signifying a fickle or capricious person. The English referred to Memeskia as "Old Briton" due to his steadfast attachment to the English and their trade goods.

A prominent member of the Piankashaw tribe, Memeskia was one of the earliest opponents of the expanding French presence in North America regarding their dominance, monopoly and lower barter prices in the fur trade of the western Great Lakes region, as they sought to expand New France. In 1747, Old Briton (as he was then known) led a rebellion with a confederation of local tribes, against local French settlements successfully attacking Fort Miami at Kekionga. In the late 1740s, he led a band of the Piankashaw tribe, known as the Tewightewee, from areas that would later be in Indiana east along the St. Marys River to Loramie Creek, and settled near the confluence of Loramie Creek and the Great Miami River, a day's journey from the Loramie Summit. Old Briton established his village of Pickawillany in the Ohio Country, and in 1750 allowed a trading post and nearby stockade for early British traders and settlers from Pennsylvania, in defiance of French claims to the region. The village quickly gained notoriety as a frontier outpost, but only for a short time; the location would later develop as Piqua, Ohio.

Rival tribes, loyal to France and under Métis chieftain Charles Langlade, attacked Pickawillany in June 1752, with a force consisting of around 240 Ottawa and Ojibwa. They eventually captured three of the British traders and killed several tribesmen. Memeskia, to symbolize the victors' extreme distaste for his friendship with the English, was boiled and ritually cannibalized. Langlade's raid on Pickawillany, which drove British traders out of the Ohio Country, was one of the events leading up to the French and Indian War. The Tewightewee fled the region, paving the way for settlement by the neighboring Shawnee. Memeskia was a Miami Indian.
