= Fort Miami (Indiana) =

French forts in colonial North America

Fort Miamis
- Fort Wayne

Site information
- Type: Fort
- Controlled by: New France, Kingdom of Great Britain

Site history
- Built: Around 1706
- In use: 1706-1794
- Battles/wars
- Fort Miami
- U.S. National Register of Historic Places
- Location within Indiana
- Location: Fort Wayne, Indiana
- Coordinates: 41°03′03″N 85°04′52″W
- Area: 23.75 acres (9.61 ha)
- NRHP reference No.: 10000944
- Added to NRHP: November 26, 2010

Fort Miami, originally called Fort St. Philippe or Fort des Miamis, were a pair of French built palisade forts established at Kekionga, the principal village of the Miami. These forts were situated where the St. Joseph River and St. Marys River merge to form the Maumee River in Northeastern Indiana, where present day Fort Wayne is located. The forts and their key location on this confluence allowed for a significant hold on New France (and later the Old Northwest) by whomever was able to control the area, both militarily for its strategic location and economically as it served as a gateway and hotbed for lucrative trade markets such as fur.

The fort therefore played a pivotal role in a number of conflicts including the French and Indian Wars, Pontiac's War, and the Northwest Indian War, while other battles occurred nearby including La Balme's Defeat and the Harmar campaign. The first construct was a small trading post built by Jean Baptiste Bissot, Sieur de Vincennes around 1706, while the first fortified fort was finished in 1722, and the second in 1750. It is the predecessor to the Fort Wayne.

== Prehistory and original settlement ==
Archeological evidence indicates that this area around the confluence has been occupied successively by indigenous peoples for as long as 10,000 years. Some of the earliest known European contact in the area occurred in the 1690s by the French following eastward migration of the Miami towards the later portion of the Beaver Wars. The French explorers described the Miami controlled portage connecting the Maumee to the Wabash as the "Toll road swamp". In 1702, Vincennes was known to have begun visiting the growing Miami town on behalf of New France due to its increasing significance on the trade route. The land was well received by the French in reports back, "The soil was rich, game was abundant and the weather much better than that of France." This region on the eastern border of the confluence, known as the Great Black Swamp, was situated south through southwest of Lake Erie and had grown abundant with wildlife following a long untouched period during Iroquois warfare. Antoine de la Mothe Cadillac described it as "the finest land under heaven - fishing and hunting are most abundant there". With speculation around the exact date, it is believed that Vincennes established a small post for trading in 1706. The fort would be one of the first posts established by the French along the Wabash-Maumee route.

== History ==
=== French control (1715-1760) ===
By 1715, British fur traders had made their way to the area and set to establish strongholds along the Wabash and Maumee river valleys. British colonists in the Carolinas pursued attempts to gain an alliance with the Miamis and pit them against the French who had founded the trading post at Kekionga a decade prior. Facing pressure, the French colonial government and Vincennes devised a plan to relocate the Miamis from the headwaters of the Maumee to the center of the St. Joseph River near present-day South Bend, Indiana. However, Vincennes, who was popular with the Miami, would soon die destroying any possibility of what had originally been a plausible plan. The Miami refused to abandon their village and move farther west away from British traders, so Governor Philippe de Rigaud Vaudreuil authorized Captain Dubuisson to build a strong fort to protect the trade routes of New France, which would be completed in 1722.

In a report to the Council of the Marine, de Vaudreuil stated:

The log fort Fort Miami which he Dubuisson had build is the finest in the upper country. It is a strong fort and safe from the savages. This post which is of considerable worth ought to have a missionary. One could be sent there in 1724 if next year the council will send the four Jesuits which I ask.

It is unlikely that this requested priest was ever sent.

The recognized value of the fort was two-fold; Its location on the portage and confluence, which Little Turtle once described as the "glorious gate", allowed it to serve as a natural gateway to the trade route, thus allowing for a stronghold on the lucrative fur trade, while its embedment within the ally village of Kekionga offered protection from hostile tribes. The French soon militarized the post and garrisoned it with 20 to 30 soldiers. The fort paid off and the French were able to maintain a strong influence on the region, particularly due to its role in the fur trade and successful act as a counterbalance to British colonists. This period led until 1747, when British-allied Huron warriors under Chief Nicholas found it undermanned—the commandant, Ensign Douville, and most of the soldiers were away at Fort Detroit. The fort was sacked and burned to the ground.

Upon receiving the news that the fort had been sacked, Captain Dubuisson, along with Miami chiefs Cold Foot, Porc Epic, and a force of sixty men, made haste back to Kekionga from Fort Detroit. The group returned to find the fort partially destroyed, and Dubuisson would leave Captain Charles DeRaymond in charge before returning to Detroit. Around this time in 1749, Father de Bonnecamps described the bare and brutish conditions:

The French there number twenty-two; all of them... had the fever... there were eight houses, or to speak more correctly, eight miserable huts which only the desire of making money render endurable.

It is possible that the uncertain friendship with the natives, plus the remoteness of the site dissuaded any other type of settlers aside from tradesmen and military. Over time, Governor DeRaymond, dissatisfied with the state of his decaying fort, eventually chose a spot for a new fort on high ground near the left bank of the St. Joseph River. It was completed in early 1750 and sat where the present St Joseph Boulevard and Delaware Avenue cross. Chief Cold Foot, a close friend of the French, resided in the unused buildings of the old fort, which would become the center of a Miami settlement known as Cold Foot Village.

An outbreak of smallpox would occur in the village the following winter in 1751, killing several including Cold Foot and his son. That same year prior to the winter, Governor DeRaymond wrote that:

My people [the French traders] are leaving me for Detroit. Nobody wants to stay here and have his throat cut. All of the tribes who go to the English at Pickawillany come back loaded with gifts. I am too weak to meet the danger. Instead of twenty men, I need five hundred... The tribes here are leaguing together to kill all the French... This I am told by Cold Foot, a great Miami chief, whom I think an honest man... If the English stay in this country, we are lost. We must attack and drive them out.

DeRaymond, relieved, would be replaced by Neyon de Villers as fort commandant that year in 1751. By 1752, tensions between the pro-French and pro-British villages in the area had reached a boiling point when a British trader, John Pathin, was captured in the fort. New York Governor George Clinton demanded an explanation of the capture, to which the French colonial Governor Marquis de la Jonquière shot back:

The English, far from confining themselves within the limits of the King of Great Britain's possessions, not satisfied with multiplying themselves more and more on Rock River... have more than that proceeded within sight of Detroit, even unto the fort of the Miamis... John of Detroit, an inhabitant of Willensten, has been arrested in the French fort of the Miamis by M. de Villiers, commandant of that post... he entered the fort of the Miamis to persuade the Indians who remainder, to unite with those who have fled to the beautiful river [the Ohio]. He has been taken in the French fort. Nothing more is necessary.

Shortly thereafter in 1752, two soldiers were caught outside the fort and scalped by "La Demoiselle’s savages" from the nearby breakaway British post of Pickawillany. In November 1760, at the close of the French and Indian War, the French garrison formally surrendered Fort Miami to a British Army ensign named Holmes.

=== Forts without a garrison, British influence, French and American defeats (1761-1794) ===
In 1763, during Pontiac's Rebellion, the British lost control of the fort after Holmes was lured outside by his Miami lover and immediately shot and killed by a group of Miami waiting for him. Holme's head was cut off, brought into the fort, and thrown into a bed. The rest of the garrison was then massacred, with only five members surviving. From this point forward, no active garrison would exist at the fort for the next three decades and its population would be described as a varied mix of British and French traders, American frontiersmen and local natives. Around this time in 1765, the trader George Croghan rode the Wabash all the way up to Kekionga providing a critical account:

The Twightwee [Miami] village is situated on both sides of a river called St. Joseph. This river where it falls into the Miami [Maumee] river about a quarter of a mile from this place is one hundred yards wide, on the east side of which stands a stockade fort, somewhat ruinous. The Indian village consists of about forty or fifty cabins, besides nine or ten French houses, a runaway colony from Detroit during the late Indian war; they were concerned in it, and being afraid of punishment came to this post, where ever since they have spirited up the Indians against the English. All the French residing here a lazy indolent people. Fond of breeding mischief... and should by no means be suffered to remain here... The country is pleasant, the soil rich and well watered.

In 1772, Sir William Johnson suggested to the British government the idea of reoccupying Fort Miami for importance it held. Tensions between inhabitants of the fort and the British had cooled, and they were therefore willing to accept friendship with the British. In 1776, during the American Revolutionary War, it was placed under strict supervision by the British officer Jacques LaSalle, whose duties were to check passports of travelers coming down from Detroit to the Wabash or Ohio, and to ensure that the natives remained allied with the British.

==== La Balme's defeat ====
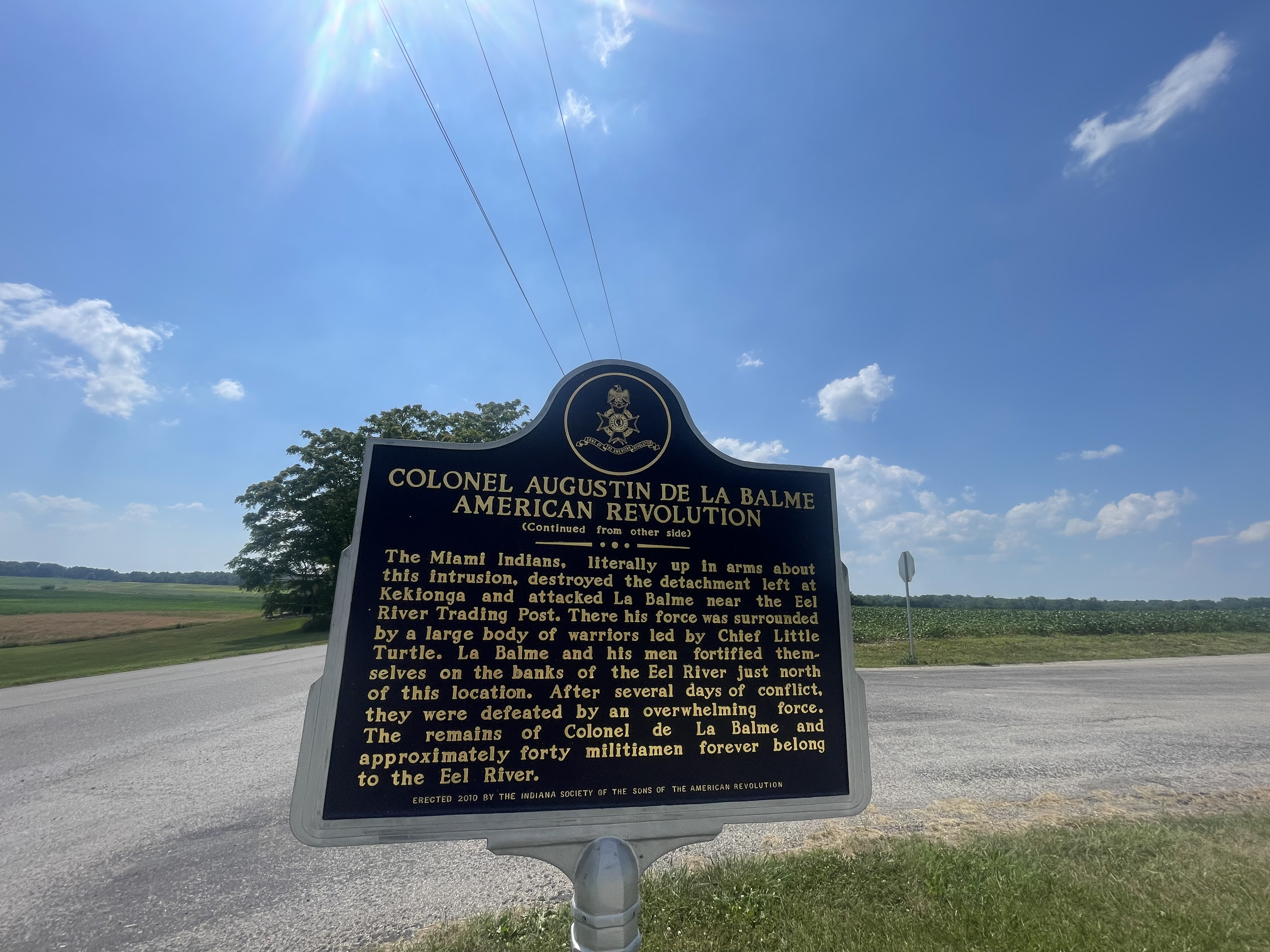
Historical signage at the corner of E Dela Balme/E Old Trail road indicating the history of La Balme and his troops near this area during the American Revolution

In 1780, with the town refortified by the British and the fort again made a successful trading post, it was sacked yet again by a force under Augustin de La Balme, a French cavalry officer who came to the United States to assist the Americans. The force raided the stores and held the location for two weeks, before La Balme would set off for the Miami sites along the Eel River, leaving behind a detachment of 20 troops at Kekionga. The small force at Kekionga would soon be pummeled by Miami Chief Little Turtle and his men upon their return, and La Balme along with the rest of his unit were massacred next in what became known as La Balme's Defeat. Several of the French soldiers were reported to have begged for their surrender while being scalped alive while others were burnt alive at the stake. Reinforcements turned back upon approach after seeing that member's heads' from La Balme's unit had been impaled on spikes. The location of this defeat, which was along the banks of the Eel river, is today marked on East De La Balme road west of South Johnson road near present-day Columbia City, Indiana. It is approximately .3 miles away from the Last Home of Chief Little Turtle, which was within shouting distance of the Eel River Post Fort, and about 2.7 miles down the river from Little Turtle's Miami Village, also here in Whitley County, Indiana.

==== Hardin's defeat ====
The coalition at Kekionga remained true to their British allies even after the area was ceded to the United States at the close of the revolutionary war. It therefore became a target of American armies, leading to several noteworthy Indian victories and conflicts as part of the Northwest Indian War.

In 1790, almost exactly 10 years after La Balme's Defeat, and riding in on the same Eel River Trail as La Balme had previously, Col. John Hardin and his force of United States troops suffered harsh losses to the Northwestern Confederacy in a number of locations within sight of the forts and village, as part of the Harmar Campaign, in what became known as Hardin's Defeat. The results of which, were most deadly. Located near where the present Harmar street exists today, one large portion of troops were ambushed while crossing the Maumee:

One eyewitness declared that he could walk across the Maumee River on the bodies of dead men.

Closing of the Northwest Indian War

The Northwest Indian War ended in 1794 with the Battle of Fallen Timbers, where General Anthony Wayne finally achieved an American victory near present-day Maumee, Ohio. Following the victory, Wayne and his troops marched for two days from Fort Defiance to Kekionga where he commissioned Captain Jean François Hamtramck to build Fort Wayne; the fort which gave the name to the settlement and would later become the modern city of Fort Wayne, Indiana.

== See also ==
- Fort Wayne (fort)
- Kekionga

== Notes ==
- Allison, Harold (1986). The Tragic Saga of the Indiana Indians. Turner Publishing Company, Paducah. ISBN 0-938021-07-9.
- Poinsatte, Charles (1976). Outpost in the Wilderness: Fort Wayne, 1706-1828. Allen County, Fort Wayne Historical Society.
