= John Mitchell (geographer) =

Colonial American doctor and botanist (1711–1768)

John Mitchell (April 13, 1711 – February 29, 1768) was a colonial American physician and botanist. He created the most comprehensive and perhaps largest 18th-century map of eastern North America, known today as the Mitchell Map. First published in 1755, in conjunction with the imminent Seven Years' War, the map was subsequently used during the Treaty of Paris (1783) to define the boundaries of the newly independent United States and has been resolving border disputes since.

== Life ==
John Mitchell was born in 1711 in Lancaster County, Virginia, to a relatively well-off merchant and planting family. He went to Scotland to study at the University of Edinburgh, earning the M.A. in 1729, then studying medicine until 1731 but without receiving the M.D. He then returned to Virginia to practice medicine; by 1735 he had set up his practice at Urbanna. In his spare time, he studied natural history and became known as a botanist. He was elected to the original American Philosophical Society in 1744. In 1745, Mitchell argued that a series of epidemics occurring in Virginia were due to unsanitary troop ships from Britain.

Mitchell and his wife, Helen (about whom almost nothing is known, including her maiden name), suffered themselves from ill health. So in 1746, they moved to Britain's milder climate. En route, their ship was captured by a French privateer; although they were released, their belongings (and Mitchell's botanical samples) were confiscated, and they arrived in London with only Mitchell's small fund of investments to their name. Mitchell did not try to compete with the metropolitan doctors; instead, he established himself as an expert on exotic botany. He was elected as a fellow of the Royal Society in November 1748, his candidature citation describing him as "A Gentleman of great merit and Learning, who Some time Since communicated to the Royal Society a very curious dissertation concerning the Colour of the skin in Negroes, and who from his long residence in Virginea, & from his great application to the Study of Natural history, especially Botany, is very well acquainted with the vegetable productions of North America, being desirous of being admitted a fellow of the Royal Society, is recommended by us from our personal knowledge of him as highly deserving the Honour he desires, as we believe he will be (if chosen) a usefull and valuable member of our Body."

He continued to live in London, often touring the country estates of his aristocratic friends/patrons, occasionally writing articles and pamphlets, and living the life of a gentleman of modest means. His wife probably died soon after they reached London; Mitchell himself died in 1768.

== Mitchell's Map of the British and French Dominions in North America (1755) ==
The Mitchell Map

Mitchell's main claim to historical fame is his large map of the North American colonies that was first published in Philadelphia then in London in 1755 and was reprinted several times during the second half of the 18th century. It is the most comprehensive map of eastern North America made during the colonial era and was used as a primary map source during the Treaty of Paris for defining the boundaries of the newly independent United States. It remained important for resolving border disputes between the United States and Canada as recently as the 1980s.

== Racial studies ==
Mitchell wrote a paper in 1744 called An Essay upon the Causes of the Different Colours of People in Different Climates, submitted to the Royal Society in London by his correspondent Peter Collinson. In the paper, Mitchell claimed that the first race on earth had been a brown and reddish colour. He wrote "that an intermediate tawny colour found amongst Asiatics and Native Amerindians" had been the “original complexion of mankind”, and that other races came about by the original race spending generations in different climates.

== Notable publications ==
- Mitchell, John; Collinson, P. (1744). "An Essay upon the Causes of the Different Colours of People in Different Climates; By John Mitchell, M.D. Communicated to the Royal Society by Mr. Peter Collinson, F.R.S." Philosophical Transactions of the Royal Society of London. 43 (474): 102–50. Bibcode:1744RSPT...43Q.102M. doi:10.1098/rstl.1744.0033.
- Mitchell, John (1748). "An Account of the Preparation and Uses of the Various Kinds of Pot-Ash; by John Mitchell M.D. & F.R.S. Read Nov. 17 and 24. 1748". Philosophical Transactions of the Royal Society of London. 45 (489): 541–63. doi:10.1098/rstl.1748.0064. S2CID 186208442.
- Kaiserlich Leopoldinisch-Carolinische Deutsche Akademie der Naturforscher. Acta Physico-Medica Academiae Caesareae Leopoldino-Carolinae naturae curiosorum exhibentia ephemerides sive observationes historias et experimenta. (Vol. 8). https://www.biodiversitylibrary.org/page/41475159.
  - "Dissertatio brevis de principiis botanicorum et zoologorum deque novo stabiliendo naturae rerum congruo cum appendice" (1748) or "A short dissertation on the principles of botanism and zoology, and on a new establishment of the nature of things, with an appropriate appendix" Starting on pg. 187. Appendix: Nova Plantarum Genera. (pg. 203–224)
- Mitchell, John. Auteur du texte. (1769). D. Johannis Mitchell Dissertatio brevis de principiis botanicorum et zoologorum deque novo stabiliendo naturae rerum congruo, cum appendice, aliquot generum plantarum recens conditorum et in Virginia observatorum. impensis W. Schwarzkopfii (Norimbergae). https://gallica.bnf.fr/ark:/12148/bd6t5753673v/f233.double
- Mitchell, John [attrib.] (1757). The Contest in America Between Great Britain and France, With Its Consequences and Importance; Giving an Account of the Views and Designs of the French, with the Interests of Great Britain, and the Situation of the British and French Colonies, in all parts of America: In which A proper Barrier between the two Nations in North America is pointed out, with a Method to Prosecute the War, so as to obtain that necessary security for our Colonies. London: Andrew Millar.
- Mitchell, John [attrib.] (1767). The Present State of Great Britain and North America, with regard to Agriculture, Population, Trade, and Manufacture, impartially considered: Containing a particular Account of The dearth and scarcity of the necessaries of life in England; the want of staple commodities in the Colonies; the decline of their trade; increase of people; and necessity of manufactures, as well as of a trade in them hereafter. In which The causes and consequences of these growing evils, and methods of preventing them, are suggested; The proper Regulations for the Colonies, and the taxes imposed upon them, are considered, and compared with their condition and circumstances. London: T. Becket and P. A. de Hondt.
