= Battle of Fort Ligonier =

Battle of the French and Indian War

- Part of the French and Indian War
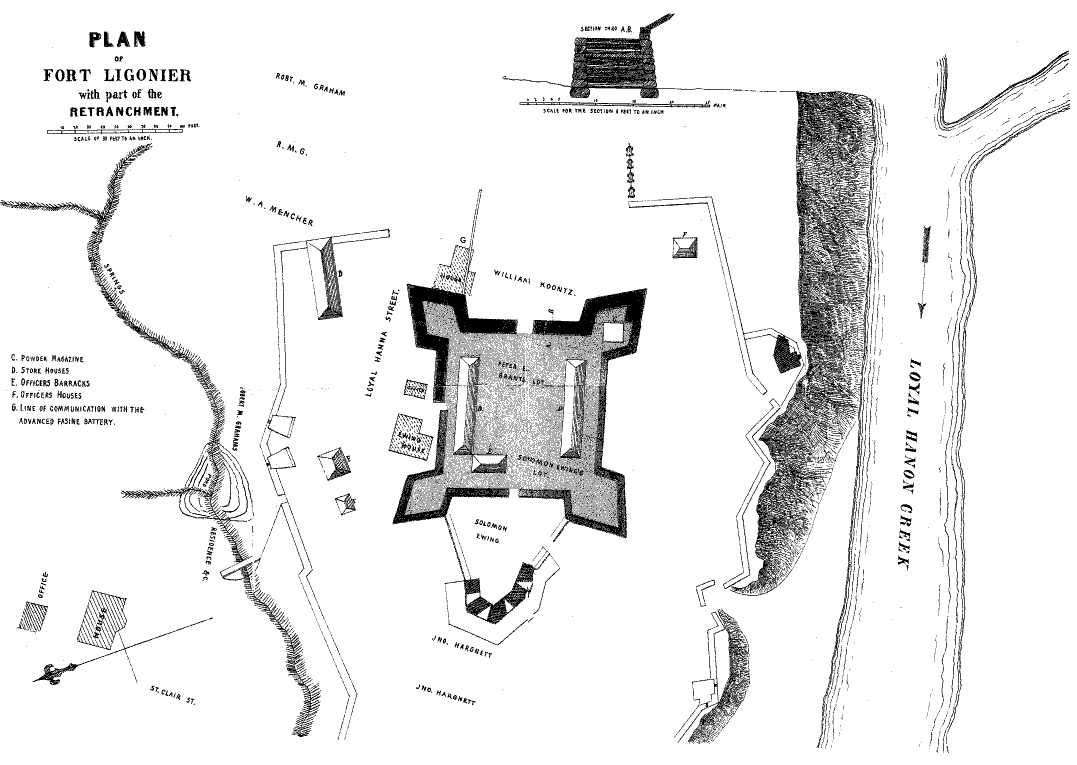
- Plan of Fort Ligonier from an 1896 publication
Date	12 October 1758
Location	present-day Ligonier, Pennsylvania 40°14′27″N 79°14′16″W
Result	British victory

Belligerents
France (New France) Colony of Canada	Great Britain; British America

Commanders and leaders
Captain Charles Philippe Aubry	Colonel James Burd

Strength
440 troupes de la marine and militia 150 Delaware Indians	Over 2,000 regulars and militia

Casualties and losses
Light	12 killed 18 wounded 31 missing

The Battle of Fort Ligonier (also known as the Battle of Loyalhanna or the Battle of Loyal Hannon) was a battle of the French and Indian War. On 12 October 1758, French and Indian forces directed from nearby Fort Duquesne were repulsed in an attack on the British outpost of Fort Ligonier, then still under construction.

== Background ==
Following the British failure to capture French-controlled Fort Duquesne in the disastrous Braddock Expedition early in the French and Indian War, the British in 1758 finally mounted a second expedition under the command of John Forbes to capture that fort, from which the French and their Indian allies had been organizing raids against British colonial frontier settlements. His expedition methodically constructed a road across the Allegheny Mountains, which had reached a safe place known as Loyal Hannon (near present-day Loyalhanna Township, Pennsylvania) by early September. Forbes' advance force, about 1,500 men under the command of Henry Bouquet then began the construction of Fort Ligonier for the purpose of establishing winter quarters. They were subjected to regular harassment by French and Indian raiding parties sent from Fort Duquesne.

To answer these raids, Bouquet authorized James Grant to lead 750 men on a reconnaissance in force of Duquesne. Grant, apparently seeking the glory of a quick victory, attempted the fort's capture on 14 September. Grant had seriously underestimated the size of François-Marie Le Marchand de Lignery's French force, which resulted in Grant's capture and nearly half his men being killed or wounded. Lignery, who was running low on supplies, and whose supply line had been cut by the British during the capture of Fort Frontenac, ordered an attack on the British position in the hopes of weakening the British advance and capturing some of their supplies. Lignery sent out virtually his entire garrison, 440 troupes de la marine and 150 Delaware Indians led by Keekyuscung, under the command of Charles Phillip Aubry (not the "De Vitri" reported in British accounts).

== Battle ==
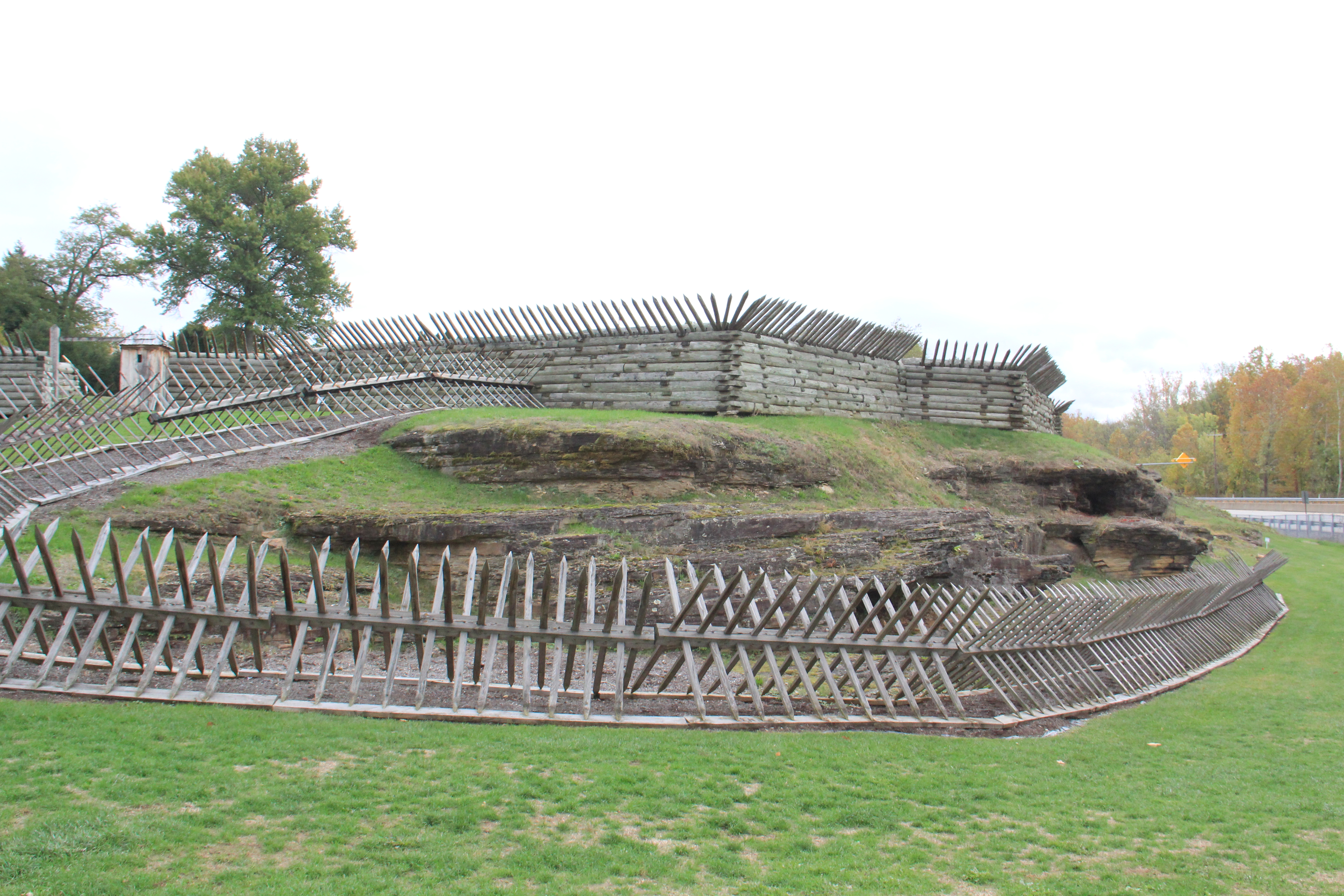
Reconstructed fortifications of Fort Ligonier

The command at Ligonier was temporarily under Pennsylvania provincial Colonel James Burd, who Bouquet had left in command while he was visiting another post on the army's route. Outside the fort he had stationed a number of men to guard supplies and others to guard the expedition's animals as they grazed, about 1.5 miles (2.4 km) from the fort. These guards, who were widely dispersed, suffered the brunt of the French and Indian attack. When the sounds of gunfire reached the fort, Colonel Burd sent out the Maryland Battalion, about 200 provincials, toward the action. These were quickly driven back to the fort by the larger French force. By this time the entire garrison, numbering about 2,000, was under arms. Burd sent out the 1st Pennsylvania Battalion to assist the Marylanders, but they all retreated into the fortifications as the French and Indians advanced. Three companies of the North Carolina Provincials were also part of this force, led by Maj. Hugh Waddell.

Driven back by active British artillery, the French and Indians retreated, and waited for darkness before renewing the attack. They seemingly made no attempt to block the road; Burd reported the arrival of men during the afternoon. Around 9:00 pm, an assault was attempted on one of the fort's redoubts; it was repulsed by further artillery. The French and Indians remained near the fort through the night, sniping at sentries, probing the defenses, and killing or taking about 200 horses before they withdrew back to Fort Duquesne.

James Smith reported what the French-allied Indians said about the battle: "They met his [Forbes's] army near Fort Ligoneer, and attacked them, but were frustrated in their design. They said that Forbes's men were beginning to learn the art of war, and that there were a great number of American riflemen along with the redcoats, who scattered out, took trees, and were good marks-men; therefore they found they could not accomplish their design, and were obliged to retreat." He wrote further that: "The Indians said if it was only the red-coats they had to do with, they could soon subdue them, but they could not withstand Ashalecoa, or the Great Knife, which was the name they gave the Virginians."

== Aftermath ==
Casualties were relatively light for the attackers. Aubry's superior officer, General Montcalm, reported casualties at two killed and seven wounded, but Burd also reported burying four Frenchmen. British casualties were higher; the French reported taking 100 scalps and seven prisoners, while the British report 12 killed, 18 wounded, and 31 missing. 3 men of the North Carolina Provincials were killed during the fighting. Colonel Bouquet was not happy with the performance of his troops during the battle, writing to Forbes that "[this] enterprise, which should have cost the enemy dearly, shows a great deal of contempt for us, and the behavior of our troops in the woods justifies their idea only too well."

The British continued work on Ligonier, and after General Forbes arrived on 2 November, advanced on Fort Duquesne in force. On 24 November, Lignery destroyed Fort Duquesne, sending his men to other forts to the north and west.

Fort Ligonier continued to see service through Pontiac's Rebellion, after which it was abandoned. It was reconstructed, and the site is now on the National Register of Historic Places.
