= Delaware George =

Delaware George may refer to:

- Keekyuscung, Lenape warrior and chief, killed at the Battle of Bushy Run, 1763
- Nenatcheehunt, Lenape chief, died 1762
