= Robert Stobo =

Scottish-American frontiersman and soldier (1726/27-1770)

- Born: 1726/27; Glasgow, Scotland
- Died: 1770
- Military career
- Allegiance: Great Britain
- Branch: Virginia militia British Army
- Service years: 1754–1770
- Rank: Major
- Units: Virginia Militia; 15th Regiment of Foot
- Conflicts: French and Indian War

Major Robert Stobo (1726/27–1770) was an 18th-century Scottish-born colonial American frontiersman and soldier. Stobo was an officer in the Virginia militia who, during the French and Indian War, acted as a spy while a prisoner-of-war at Fort Duquesne. He was later convicted as a spy in Quebec and, while a prisoner there, was able to gain invaluable knowledge of the local area which was later used by British forces during the capture of Quebec.

== Biography ==
The only son of merchant William Stobo, Robert Stobo was born in Glasgow, Scotland and sent off to the Colony of Virginia when his parents died. In the care of Glasgow merchants, he worked in their store for much of his early childhood. When he came of age, he sold the property left to him by his parents and used the money to open his own business in Virginia although the venture ultimately proved unsuccessful. A favorite of colonial Lieutenant-Governor Robert Dinwiddie, he was appointed a captain in the Virginia militia shortly before the French and Indian War.

In order to ensure the compliance of the surrender terms agreed to by Major George Washington following the Battle of the Great Meadows, he and Captain Jacob Van Braam were left as prisoners-of-war on 28 July 1754 in the care of Captain Coulon de Villiers at Fort Duquesne until at such time they could be released in a prisoner exchange. During his captivity, he was an open prisoner and spent his time making detailed sketches of the fort and plans for its destruction. In a letter containing these plans he wrote, "For my part I would die ten thousand deaths to have the pleasure of possessing this fort..." His plans concluded that one hundred Indians could take the fort. He was able to get these sketches to British forces by giving them to the Lenape warrior Keekyuscung who smuggled them out of the fort, however these papers were recovered by the French after the Battle of the Monongahela and he was sent to Quebec where he was tried and convicted as a spy. Stobo was sentenced to death, although his sentence was commuted to closed confinement. He managed to escape from prison and, arriving on a ship from Halifax, he rejoined British forces at Louisburgh on the island of Cape Breton shortly after General James Wolfe had departed for Quebec. Following after him, Stobo was able to catch up to Wolfe and provide him with knowledge of the area including the landing site chosen for Wolfe's forces during the capture of Quebec.

In November 1771 George Washington wrote a letter to Stobo concerning land claims under Governor Dinwiddie; however Stobo killed himself on 19 June 1770.

His memoirs were kept in the British Museum for nearly a century until 1854 when the manuscript was published in Pittsburgh in part due to efforts by Liverpool merchant James McHenry.

== See also ==
- Captivity Narratives - Nova Scotia
