= Keekyuscung =

Lenape warrior and chief

- Died: 6 August 1763 now Pennsylvania, United States
- Children: Wolf
- Military career
- Conflicts: 7 Years War; Battle of Fort Ligonier; Pontiac's War; Battle of Bushy Run †

Keekyuscung (fl. 31 January 1754 - died 6 August 1763) aka Kickyuscung, Kaquehuston, Kikyuskung, Ketiuscund, Kekeuscund, or Ketiushund, was a Lenape chief. In the 1750s he took part in peace negotiations to end Lenape participation in the 7 Years War. In 1754 he briefly engaged in some spying and smuggled some letters into and out of Fort Duquesne for George Washington. He was sympathetic to Great Britain for many years, but in 1763 he and his son Wolf sided with France after a failed assassination attempt by Henry Bouquet. He is known for being one of the Native American leaders that attacked Colonel Bouquet's forces at the Battle of Bushy Run, where Keekyuscung was killed.

== Delaware George ==
Confusingly, Christian Post refers to both Nenatcheehunt and Keekyuscung as "Delaware George," although they were two different individuals who lived in western Pennsylvania at roughly the same time. It is not always clear which of these leaders is being referred to, as both men attended many of the same meetings and events. Hugh Mercer refers to Keekyuscung as "Delaware George."

== Early life ==
Nothing is known of Keekyuscung's early life. Post reports that "he was considered a great warrior, and fought with the Six Nations against the Cherokees." Post says that Keekyuscung means "healer" in the Unami dialect, coming from kikehwèchik.

== Role in peace negotiations ==
In October 1753, Shingas, with his brother Pisquetomen, and Delaware George, met Deputy Hamilton's Commissioners in a conference at Carlisle, Pennsylvania.

Keekyuscung and many other leaders met with George Croghan at Logstown in January 1754. On 31 January 1754, a signed speech addressed to the Governor of Virginia was delivered by the chiefs Tanacharison, Scarouady, Netawatwees, Coswentannea, Tonelaguesona, Shingas, and "Delaware George". In this message they requested the construction of a fort on the Monongahela River (later the site of Fort Pitt): "...we now request, that our Brother, the Governor of Virginia may build a Strong House at the Forks of the Mohongialo, and send some of our young brethren, the warriors, to live in it...as our enemies are just at hand, and we do not know what day they may come upon us."

Direct peace negotiations between the British and the Ohio proceeded rapidly after the appearance of Pisquetomen and Keekyuscung in Teedyuscung's town of Wyoming, Pennsylvania in June 1758.

On 12 August 1758, Delaware George, Tamaqua and many other Wyandot, Shawnee and Miami chiefs met with Brigadier-General Robert Monckton at Pittsburgh to discuss the handover of white prisoners.

At a July 1759 meeting, Tamaqua was accompanied by Delaware George (which refers here to Nenatcheehunt), Shingas, Keekyuscung, Killbuck, and Captain Pipe to the newly constructed Fort Pitt to negotiate with Colonel Hugh Mercer, George Croghan and William Trent about the release of captives held in Lenape communities.

== Smuggling letters for Washington, 1754 ==
On 21 June 1754, George Washington persuaded Keekyuscung (whom he refers to as Kaquehuston) to carry letters written by French deserters into Fort Duquesne, in order to encourage other French soldiers to desert. Washington also asked Nenatcheehunt "to go and take a View of the Fort."

On 16 August 1754, George Croghan wrote Hamilton from his home on Aughwick Creek stating that Tanacharison and Scarouady, with several other Native Americans and their families, had been there since Washington surrendered Fort Necessity to the French on 4 July; and that Keekyuscung and several other Lenape came there from Fort Duquesne. Keekyuscung had smuggled out two letters from Captain Robert Stobo, one of the hostages given to the French by Washington, who was then detained by the French at the fort. Stobo included in his letters detailed plans of the fort and information about its garrison. When the Governor of New France, Michel-Ange Menneville, read George Washington's captured journal, he noted that a Native American had been smuggling Stobo's letters out of the fort, and ordered the fort's commandant, Claude-Pierre Contrecœur, to punish him:

Find out, without attracting notice, whether that Loup [a French term for the Algonquian ethnic groups, including the Lenape] whom he says delivered the letters to the soldiers of your garrison is still at the fort, and do not fail to make him regret such a message. Examine once again the conduct of the one you called your friend, and you will see how suspicious you must be of such traitors.

== Role in the 7 Years War ==
Keekyuscung joined Shingas and Captain Jacobs on at least one raid on British settlements in November 1755, the Great Cove massacre. One eyewitness, the captive Charles Stuart, reports seeing him (Delaware George) "who had been on a Hill at a Small Distance," conversing with Shingas, and then escorting captives, horses and cattle towards Kittanning after the massacre. There are no reports of Keekyuscung participating in the violence.

== Travels with Christian Post, 1758 ==
In July 1758, the Moravian missionary Christian Post traveled along the Great Shamokin Path with Pisquetomen and Keekyuscung to the town of Kuskusky "in order to gain information as to the situation among the natives there, and to advise them of the peace measures." On 18 August, Post wrote in his journal: "Delaware George is very active in endeavoring to establish a peace. I believe he is in earnest."

Keekyuscung told Post, "We alone cannot make a Peace, it would be of no signification; for as all the Indians to the Sun Rise to Sun Set are united in one body, tis necessary that the whole should join in the Peace or it can be no Peace." Keekyuscung later admitted to Post that, although he supported the British, he and 150 other Lenape had been persuaded by the French to join them in the assault on Loyalhanna on 12 October 1758.

On 22 November 1758, Keekyuscung arrived to inform Post that General Forbes and his army were within fifteen miles of Fort Duquesne, and that the French had dismantled the fort and were preparing to burn it. Keekyuscung hypothesized that the French "would demolish the fort and let the English have the bare ground, saying '...We will be back early enough in the spring to destroy them [the British]. We will come with seventeen nations of Indians and a great army of French, and build a strong fort.'" Finally, Keekysucung informed Post that the garrison at Fort Dusquesne consisted of eleven hundred men "almost starved with hunger," and that without the support of Native Americans loyal to the French, most of them would have deserted. This was a crucial piece of information for Forbes in his preparations to assault the fort. On 24 November, the French abandoned the fort and withdrew.

In 1759, Pisquetomen and Keekyuscung traveled to Philadelphia. Later, upon meeting Christian Post at Wyoming, they indicated that they had come "to see some of the Inhabitants of Pennsylvania with whom we could speak ourselves, for we cannot believe all that we hear, and know not what is true and what is false." Keekyuscung, referred to as "Ketiushund, one of the chief counsellors," warned Post that

all the nations [clans] had jointly agreed to defend their hunting place at Allegheny, and suffer nobody to settle there. Tell the Governor, the General, and all the other people not to settle there. And if the English will draw back over the mountain, we will get all the other nations into the English interest. But if the English stay and settle there, all the nations will be against you. And I fear that if the English do not listen, there will be a great war, and we will never come to peace again."

== Later life ==
Keekyuscung had a son, Wolf, by a Wyandot woman.

In early May, 1763, Colonel Henry Bouquet sent 13 men from Bedford, Pennsylvania, disguised as native americans, to kill Keekyuscung, but they were unsuccessful.

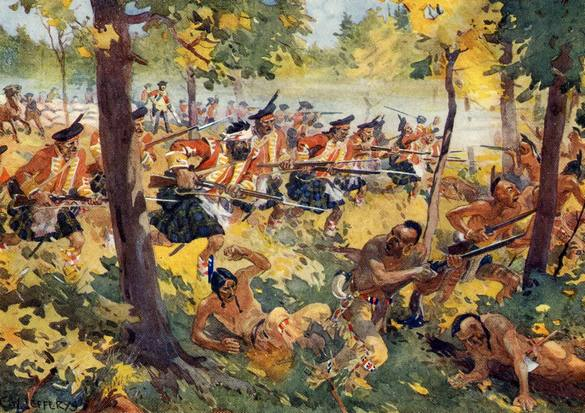
Highlanders charge at the Battle of Bushy Run, where Keekyuscung was killed

On May 28, 1763, Keekyuscung, his son Wolf, and two other natives allegedly murdered and scalped former Colonel William Clapham, his wife and child at Clapham's farm on Sewickley Creek. This was reportedly done in retaliation for the destruction of a Lenape community at Great Island (Lock Haven, Pennsylvania), ordered by Clapham in November, 1756. Wolf may also have been seeking revenge for having been arrested and imprisoned at Fort Pitt in 1762 on charges of horse theft. He had escaped and plotted his revenge together with his father.

== Battle of Bushy Run ==
At the Battle of Bushy Run on 6 August 1763, Keekyuscung and his son Wolf ambushed Colonel Henry Bouquet's forces as they were marching to relieve the besieged troops at Fort Pitt. He and Wolf knew that if Bouquet was prevented from relieving Fort Pitt, the fortress must fall or be evacuated. Standing behind a large tree, on the night of August 5 and 6, he bellowed vulgar threats against Bouquet's troops in broken English. The British tricked the Native Americans into charging and then attacked them from the rear. They killed an estimated 60 warriors, including Keekyuscung and Wolf. In a letter to William Johnson on 23 August 1763, Jeffrey Amherst reported the death of Keekyuscung and his son.

== See also ==
- Pisquetomen
- Shingas
- Nenatcheehunt
