= Forbes Expedition =

Expedition of the French and Indian War

- Part of the French and Indian War
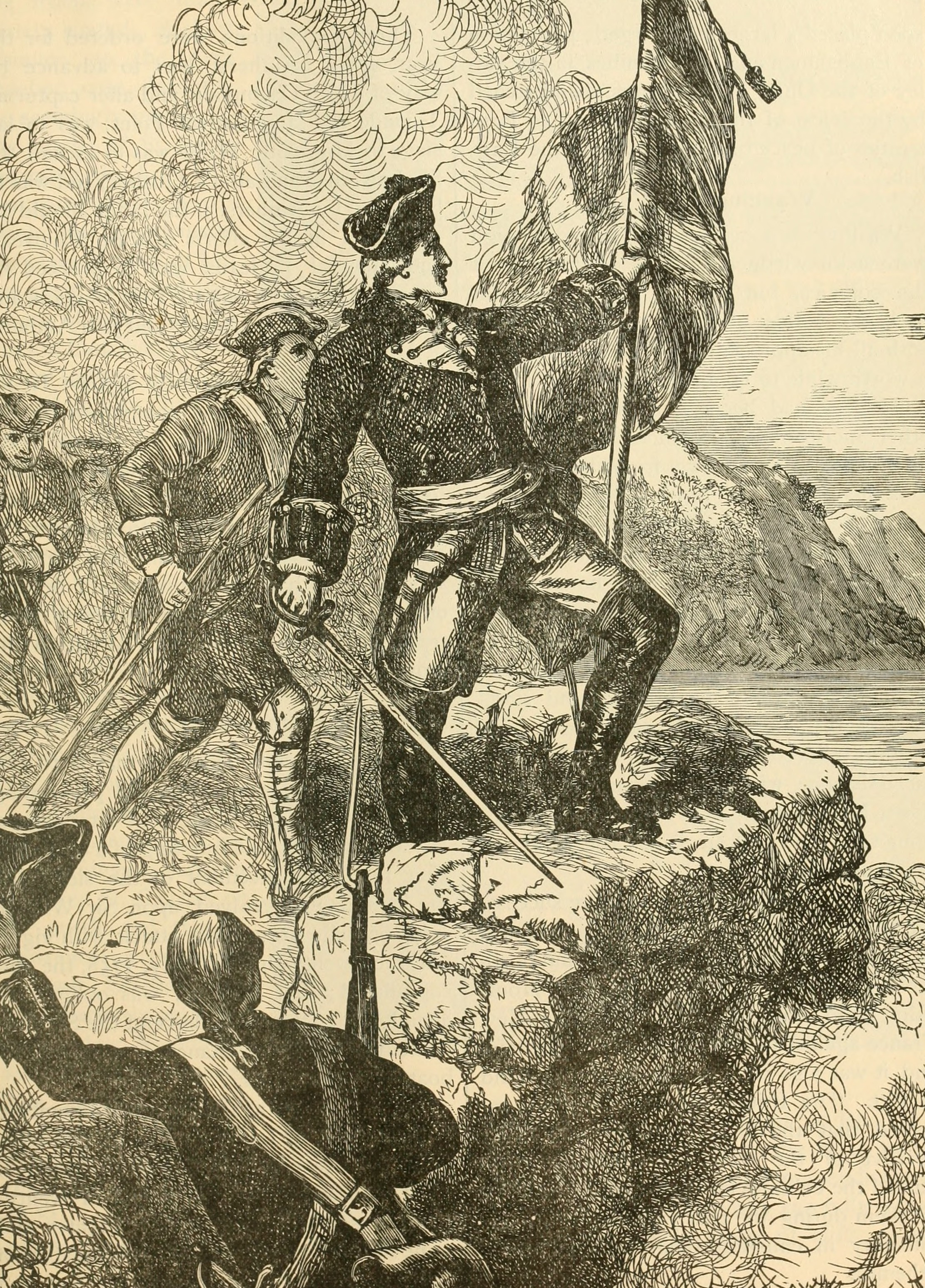
- George Washington planting the British flag on the ruins of Fort Duquesne during the expedition
Date	July - November, 1758
Location	Ohio River Valley
Result	British victory

Belligerents
Great Britain: British America	France: (New France) Colony of Canada

Commanders and leaders
(Kingdom of Great Britain) John Forbes	(Kingdom of France) François-Marie Le Marchand de Lignery

Strength
1,900 regulars 5,000 colonials	~500 militia and natives

Casualties and losses
350 killed wounded or captured	unknown

The Forbes Expedition was a British military campaign to capture Fort Duquesne, led by Brigadier-General John Forbes in 1758, during the French and Indian War. While advancing to the fort, the expedition built the Forbes Road. The Treaty of Easton served to cause a loss of Native American support for the French, resulting in the French destroying the fort before the expedition could arrive on November 24.

== Background ==
Similar to the unsuccessful Braddock Expedition early in the war, the strategic objective was the capture of Fort Duquesne, a French fort that had been constructed at the confluence of the Allegheny River and the Monongahela River in 1754. The site is now located in Pittsburgh's Golden Triangle in the downtown area (Or The Point).

=== Order of battle ===
Forbes commanded about 6,000 men, including a contingent of Virginians led by George Washington. Forbes, very ill, did not keep up with the advance of his army, but entrusted it to his second in command, Lieutenant Colonel Henry Bouquet, a Swiss mercenary officer commanding a battalion of the Royal American Regiment.

Unit	Strength
Division of 1st Battalion, Royal Americans	363
1st Highland Battalion, or 77th Foot	998
Division of 1st Highland Battalion	269
1st Virginia Regiment	782
2nd Virginia Regiment	702
Three companies of North Carolina Provincials	202
Four companies of Maryland Provincials	270
1st Battalion, Pennsylvania Regiment	755
2nd Battalion, Pennsylvania Regiment	664
3rd Battalion, Pennsylvania Regiment	771
Lower County Provincials	263

== Expedition ==
=== Forbes Road ===
Map of the route General Forbes' forces took to reach Fort Duquesne in September, 1758.

The expedition methodically constructed Forbes Road across what is now the southern part of Pennsylvania's Appalachian Plateau region, staging from Carlisle and exploiting the climb up via one of the few southern gaps of the Allegheny through the Allegheny Front, into the disputed territory of the Ohio Country, which was then a largely-depopulated Amerindian tributary territory of the Haudenosaunee Confederacy. (Note: The Haudenosaunee or Iroquois, from the early 1610s to the 1620s, began a decades long series of wars with other native peoples for control of the streams containing beaver pelts, called the Beaver Wars. The Susquehannock long defeated the Haudenosaunee, but the tribe was all but wiped out by disease by about 1670. The Erie, another tribe with a range west of the Allegheny Mountains, were similarly defeated by the Haudenosaunee during the Beaver Wars.) The well-organized expedition was in contrast to a similar expedition led by Edward Braddock in 1755, which ended in the disastrous Battle of the Monongahela.

Working for most of the summer on the construction of the road and on periodic fortified supply depots, the expedition did not come within striking distance of Fort Duquesne until September 1758. In mid-September, a reconnaissance force was soundly defeated in the Battle of Fort Duquesne when its leader, Major James Grant, attempted to capture the fort instead of gathering information alone. The French had their supply line from Montreal cut by other British actions and so attacked one of the expedition's forward outposts, Fort Ligonier, in an attempt to drive off the British or to acquire further supplies, but they were repulsed during the Battle of Fort Ligonier.

=== French strategic collapse ===
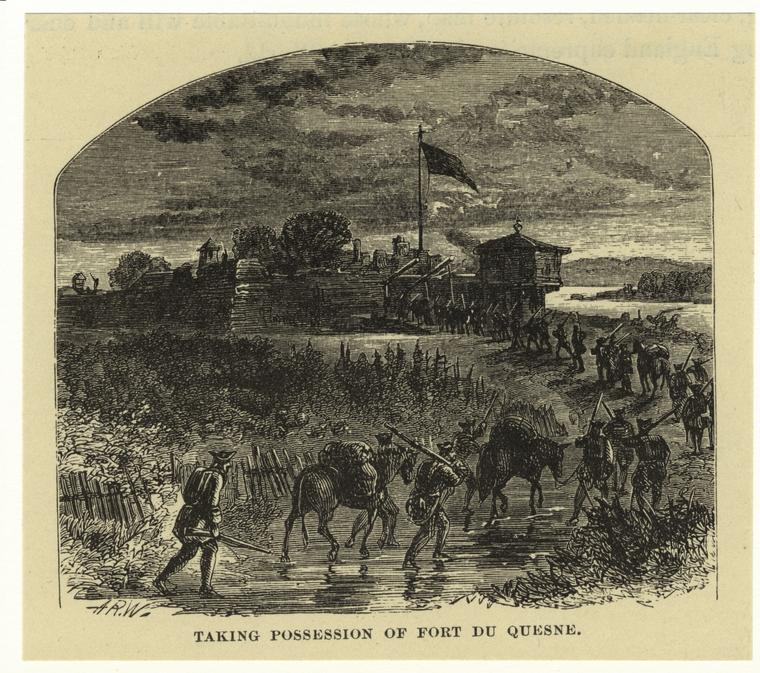
Engraving depicting the British arriving at the remains of Fort Duquesne

The Treaty of Easton concluded on October 26, 1758, caused the remnants (Note: By the mid-1670s, in the aftermath of the Beaver Wars, the Haudenosaunee had conducted aggressive war on most all surrounding tribes south of the Great Lakes, pushing many other tribes into moving west or oblivion. The ravages of disease had generated great losses regardless of decades of relentless wars over the hunting territories. When French and Indian War started, the Haudenosaunee, weakened by the 1660s defeats by the Susquehannocks, had absorbed other tribes and regained their strength. The remarkable unity of the Haudenosaunee fractured during the American Revolution, and the power of the Haudenosaunee was a casualty of the war and opened up the Ohio Country for settlement, as all remaining eastern tribes of Amerindians had become fairly weak.) of the Lenape (Delaware), Mingo, and Shawnee tribes in the Ohio Valley to abandon the French and set up the conditions that ultimately forced them to move westward once again. The collapse of Native American support made it impossible for the French to hold Fort Duquesne and the Ohio Valley. When the expedition neared to within a few miles of Fort Duquesne in mid-November, the French abandoned and blew up the fort. Three units of scouts led by Captain Hugh Waddell entered the smoking remnants of the fort under the orders of Colonel George Washington on November 24.

== Aftermath ==
General Forbes, who was ill with dysentery for much of the expedition, only briefly visited the ruins. He was returned to Philadelphia in a litter and died not long afterward. The collapse of Indian support and subsequent withdrawal of the French from the Ohio Country helped contribute to the "year of wonders" the string of British "miraculous" victories also known by the Latin phrase Annus Mirabilis.

== See also ==
- Forbes Road
- Braddock Expedition
- Nemacolin's Path
- Beaver Wars
- Susquehannock peoples
- Erie peoples
- Shawnee

== Sources ==
- Anderson, Fred (2000). Crucible of War: The Seven Years' War and the Fate of Empire in British North America, 1754–1766. New York: Alfred Knopf. ISBN 978-0-375-40642-3. OCLC 237426391.
- Cubbison, Douglas R (2010). The British Defeat of the French in Pennsylvania, 1758: A Military History of the Forbes Campaign Against Fort Duquesne. Jefferson, NC: McFarland. ISBN 978-0-7864-4739-8. OCLC 475664242.
- Fowler, William M (2005). Empires at war: The French and Indian War and the Struggle for North America 1754-1763. New York: Walker & Company. ISBN 0-8027-1411-0.
- Lowdermilk, Will H. (1878). History of Cumberland. Washington, DC.
- O'Meara, Walter (1965). Guns at the Forks. Englewood Cliffs, NJ: Prentice Hall. OCLC 21999143.
- Sipe, C. Hale (1929). The Indian Wars of Pennsylvania. Harrisburg.
