= Fort Ligonier =

- Fort Ligonier Site
- U.S. National Register of Historic Places
- Pennsylvania state historical marker
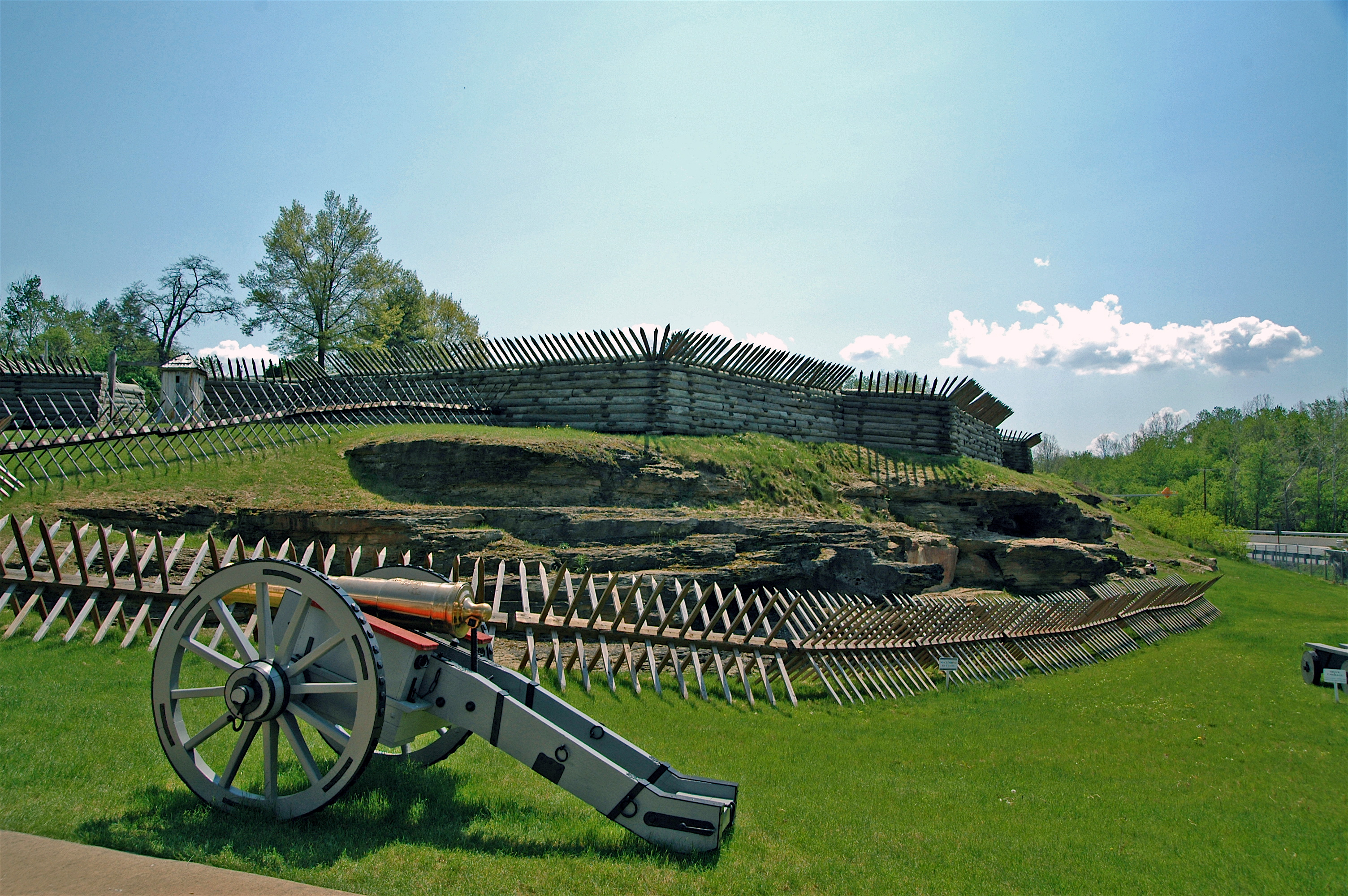

- Location within Pennsylvania Location within the United States
- Location: South Market St, Ligonier, Pennsylvania
- Coordinates: 40°14′27″N 79°14′16″W
- Area: 15 acres (6.1 ha)
- Built: 1758
- Architect: Charles M. Stotz (reconstruction)
- NRHP reference No.: 75001678

Significant dates
- Added to NRHP: January 21, 1975
- Designated PHMC: December 10, 1946

Fort Ligonier is a British fortification from the French and Indian War located in Ligonier, Pennsylvania, United States. The fort served as a staging area for the Forbes Expedition of 1758. During the eight years of its existence as a garrison, Fort Ligonier was never taken by an enemy. It served as a post of passage to the new Fort Pitt, and during Pontiac's War of 1763, was a vital link in the British communication and supply lines. It was attacked twice and besieged by the Native Americans, prior to the decisive victory at Bushy Run in August of that year. The fort was decommissioned from active service in 1766. Today, there is a museum next to the reconstructed fort. Inside the museum there are artifacts from the battle. An individual can take a guided tour of the fort, and on Fort Ligonier Days, the fort's cannons are fired.

== Forbes' campaign ==
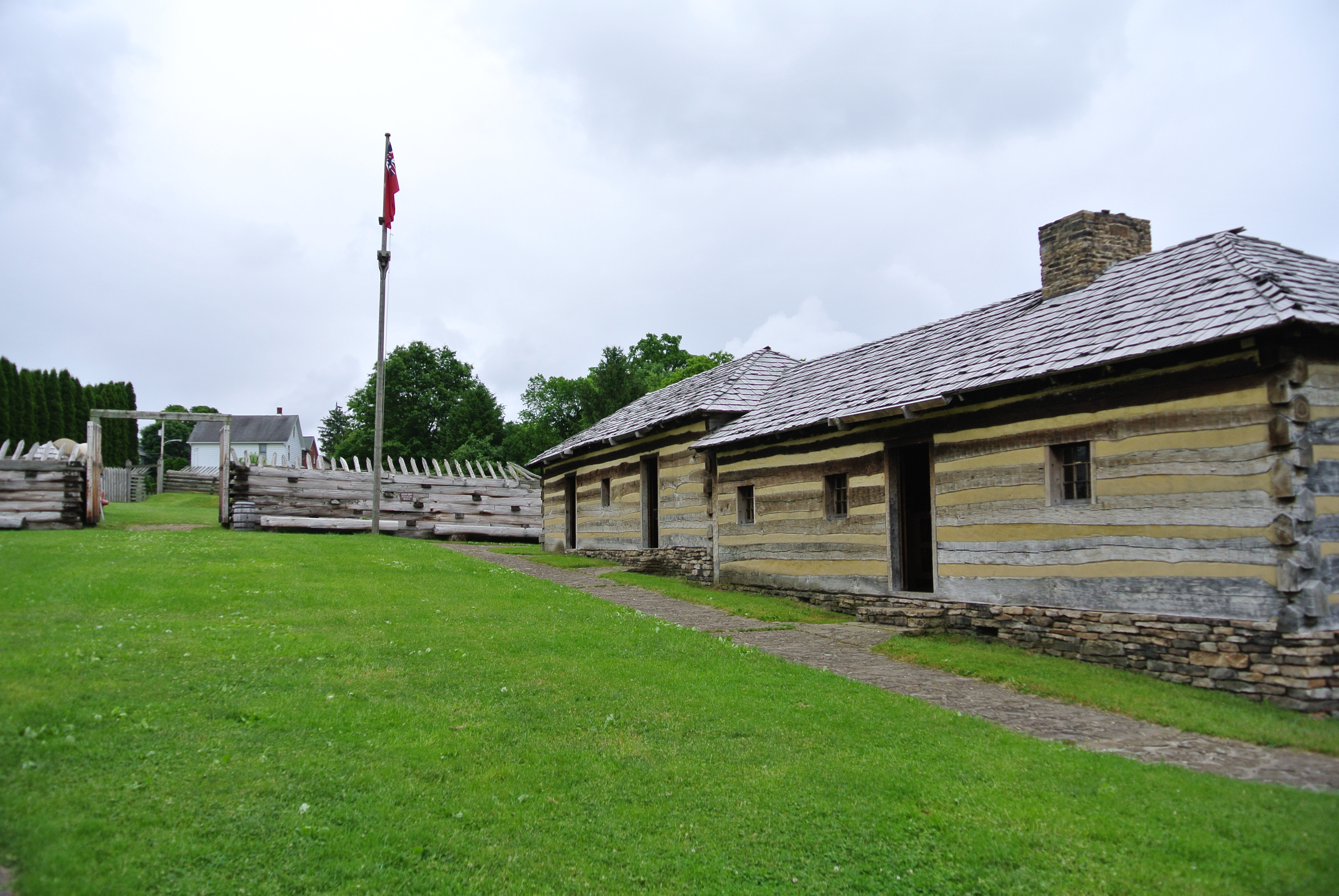
Soldier's barracks and quartermaster's store, 2012.

French victories over George Washington and Edward Braddock in 1754–55 wrested from Britain control of the strategic forks of the Ohio River (modern Pittsburgh). By 1758, General John Forbes was assigned the daunting task of seizing Fort Duquesne, the French citadel at the forks. He ordered construction of a new road across Pennsylvania, guarded by a chain of fortifications, the final link being the "Post at Loyalhanna", fifty miles from his objective.

The fort was constructed in September 1758. By late October, George Washington had arrived at Loyalhanna, but not before the defeat of a British force at Fort Duquesne on September 14, and the successful defense of Loyalhanna from a French attack on October 12. Heavily outnumbered and losers in Indian diplomacy, the French abandoned Fort Duquesne, which Forbes occupied on November 25. He designated the site "Pittsburgh" in honor of Secretary of State William Pitt. Forbes also named Loyalhanna "Fort Ligonier" after his superior, Sir John Ligonier, commander-in-chief in Great Britain.

=== Campaign timeline ===
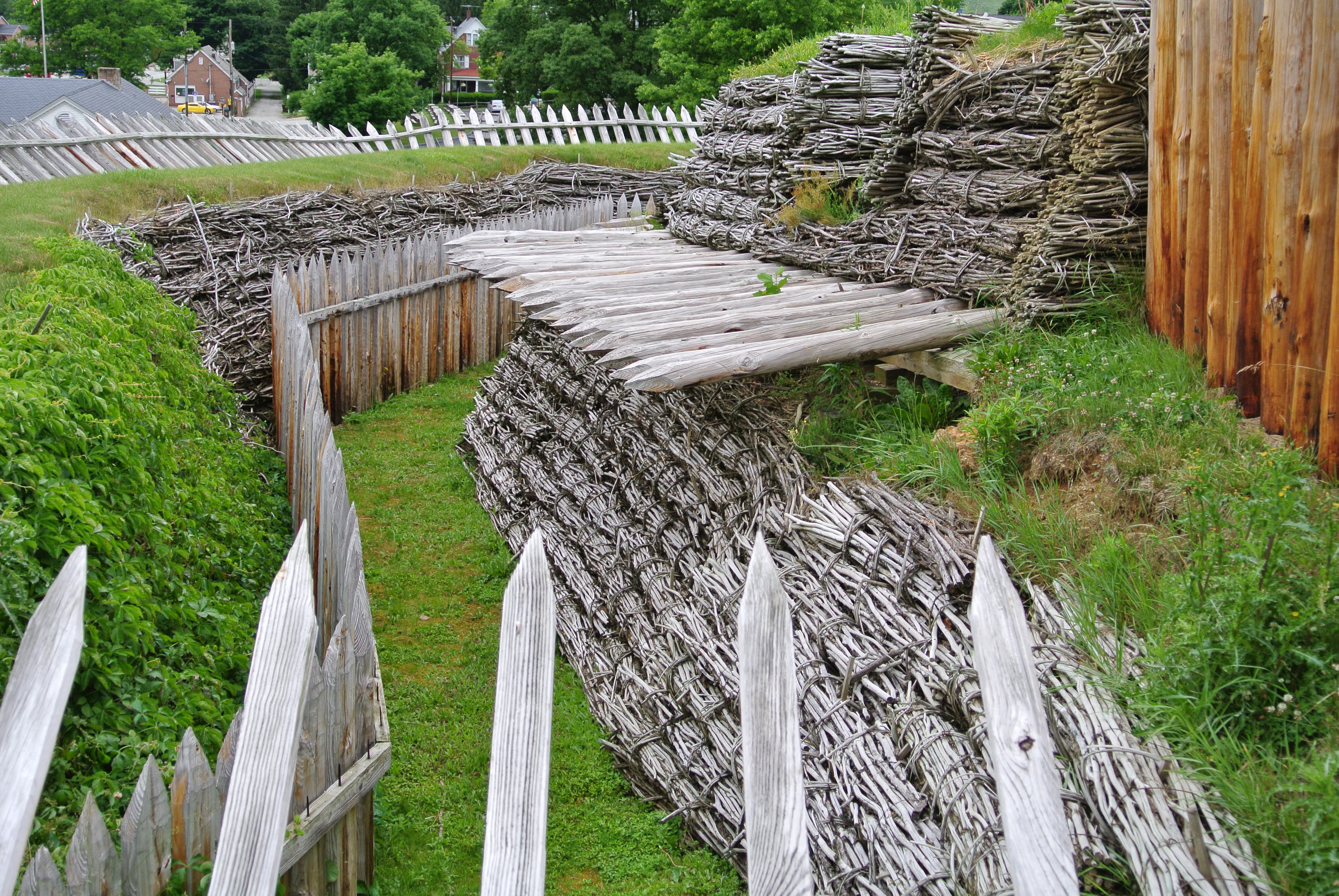
Reconstructed defenses of Fort Ligonier.

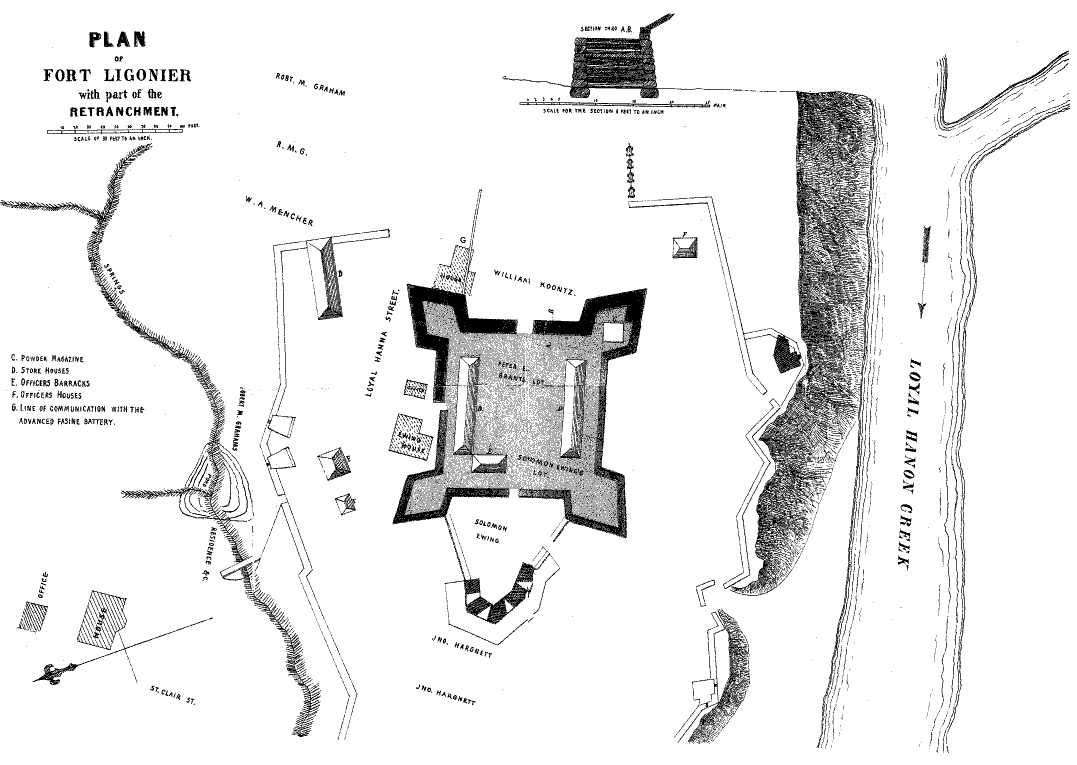
Plan of Fort Ligonier

- August 10, 1758—Colonel Bouquet ordered Major James Grant to build a road from Bedford to Ligonier (within striking distance of the French Fort Duquesne).
- August 15, 1758—Col. Bouquet sent Ensign Charles Rohr, engineer for General Forbes, to the future site of Fort Ligonier to select a location for a storehouse there.
- August 20, 1758—Col. Bouquet sent Major Grant, Col. James Burd and 1,500 men to the site to begin construction. Grant was in overall charge of the fort and men.
- August 21, 1758—Ensign Rohr picked the exact location for the fort.
- August 22, 1758—Col. Bouquet ordered Col. Burd's men and some artillerymen to build a 120-foot (37 m) storehouse for supplies and a hospital.
- August 27, 1758—Burd and Rohr reported the location of a superior site to Ligonier, nine miles (14 km) to the west. When told of the new site, Forbes directed that work continue on Fort Ligonier, since construction had already begun.
- August 29, 1758—Col. Burd and troops arrived at Fort Ligonier and built trenches around the fort.
- September 1, 1758—Bouquet sent 100 men to entrench the "Grants Paradise" location south of Latrobe, Pennsylvania.
- September 9, 1758—Major Grant left Fort Ligonier with troops and headed west to Fort Duquesne. On September 15, he approached within five miles (eight km) of Fort Duquesne before being beaten by the French, when his deliberate plan to lure out and ambush the fort's defenders went badly wrong. Bouquet arrived at Fort Ligonier with troops and wrote to Sinclair about the conditions of the fort, area and supplies, including wagons.
- October 12, 1758—While the fort was still under construction, the Battle of Fort Ligonier was fought; the four-hour assault resulted in a French defeat. The French forces attempted to attack again at nightfall, but were forced to retreat by mortar fire from the fort.
- November 12, 1758—The command of Col. Forbes ran across another squad of De Vitri's French troops lurking around Fort Ligonier. The British attacked, killing one and taking three prisoners. One of the prisoners turned out to be an Englishman who had been taken from his home in Lancaster County by anti-British Native Americans. His information concerning the weak condition of Fort Duquesne was corroborated by that of the French prisoners. Forbes therefore resolved to push forward to capture Fort Duquesne.
- November 12, 1758—Units led by George Washington (1st Virginia) and Lieutenant Colonel George Mercer (2nd Virginia) accidentally engaged each other in heavy fog and at night. Two officers and 38 men were killed or wounded.
- November 1758–4,000 troops encamped at the fort, making Ligonier the second-largest community in Pennsylvania.
- November 25, 1758—Forbes captured Fort Duquesne.
- March 1766—Fort Ligonier was abandoned after the conclusion of the French and Indian War.

== Historic site and museum ==
Interest in preserving the site of Fort Ligonier took shape by the 1930s. The William Kenly Chapter of the Daughters of the American Revolution purchased land and erected a memorial. In 1946, the Fort Ligonier Memorial Foundation (now the Fort Ligonier Association) was chartered to reconstruct the fort, and acquired ownership of the land in 1948.

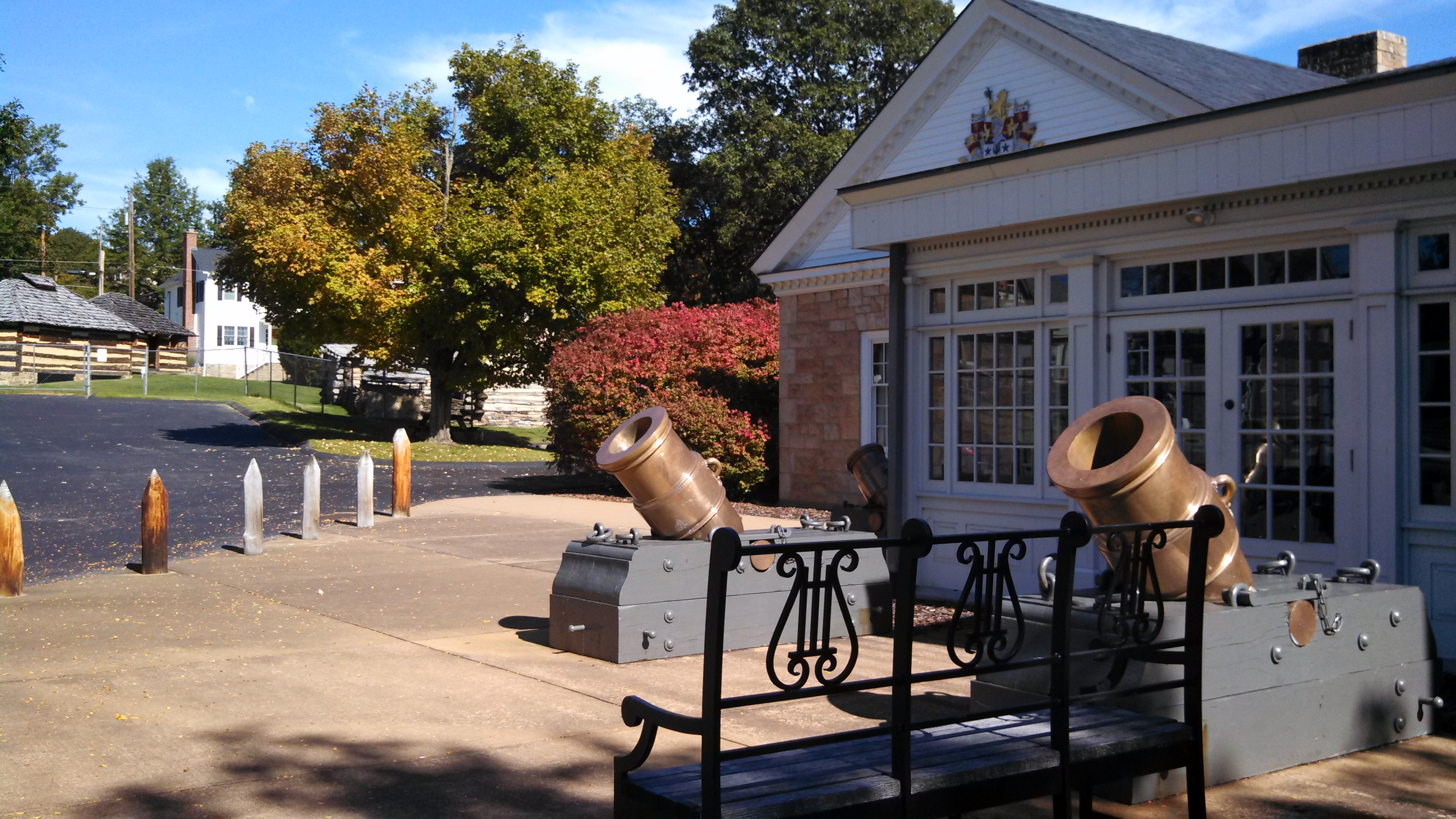
Museum at Fort Ligonier

The first archaeological excavations of Fort Ligonier began in 1947. Architect and historian Charles Morse Stotz oversaw the project and was tasked with identifying the fort's original location and layout. In 1953, the fort was reconstructed on its original location and opened to the public. In September 1958, President Dwight Eisenhower visited Fort Ligonier to celebrate the town's bicentennial. A museum opened adjacent to the fort in 1962.

Today, the historic site and museum are operated by the nonprofit Fort Ligonier Association. The reconstructed fort features wood fortifications, a moat, artillery, and several buildings including an officer's headquarters, soldiers’ bunks, and a storehouse. The museum houses exhibitions about the French and Indian War, the archaeological excavations of Fort Ligonier, and the Washington Gallery featuring artifacts belonging to George Washington.

The history of Fort Ligonier is commemorated at the Fort Ligonier Days festival, held the second weekend of October to coincide with the anniversary of the battle. The festivities include a battle reenactment and canon firings at the fort.
