= Old Fort Duquesne =

1873 novel by Charles McKnight

Old Fort Duquesne, or, Captain Jack, the Scout
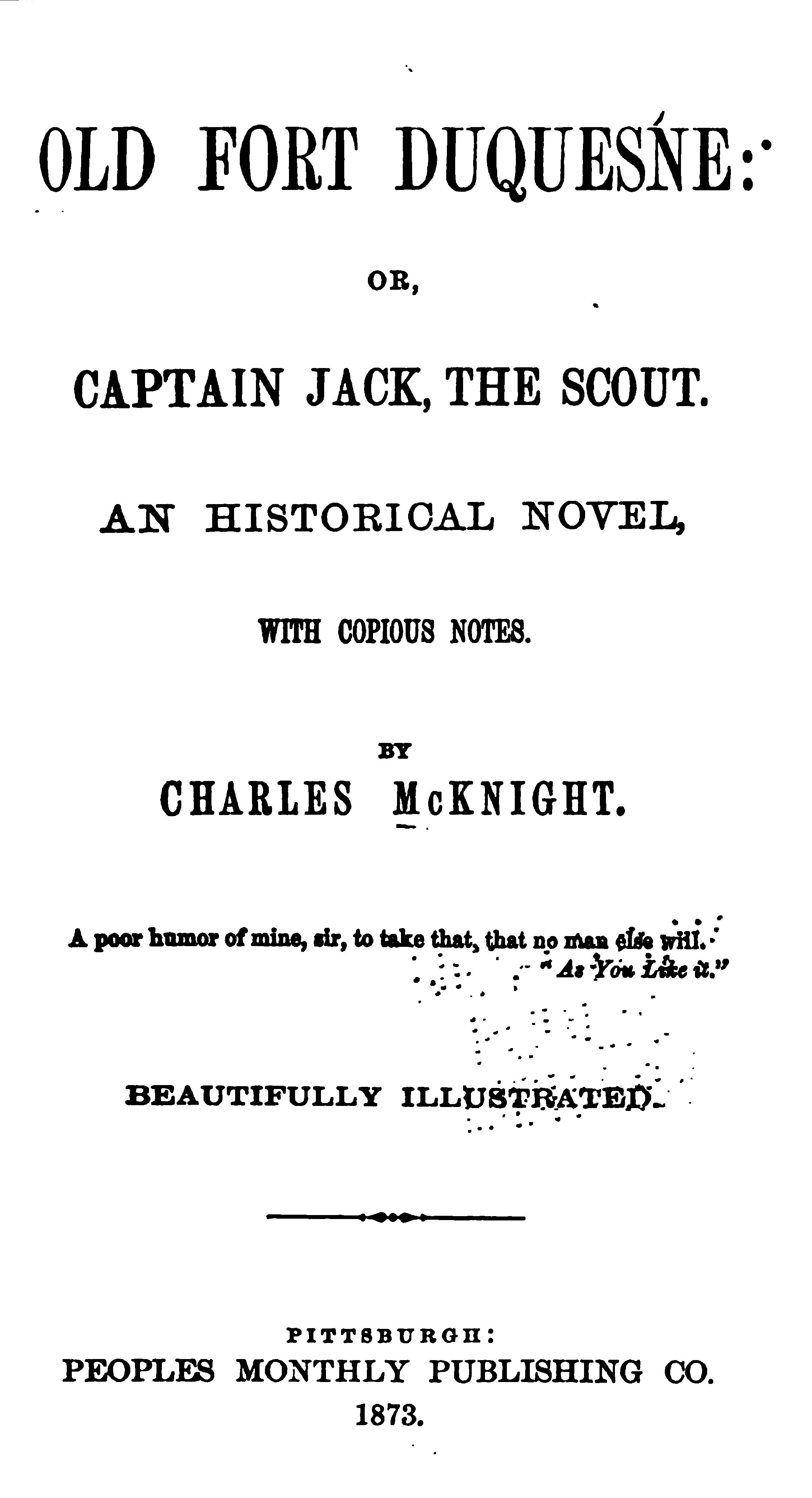
- Title page for Old Fort Duquesne, or, Captain Jack, the Scout (1873)
- Author: Charles McKnight
- Language: English
- Genre: Novel
- Publisher: Peoples Monthly Publishing Company
- Publication date: 1873
- Publication place: United States
- Media type: Print (Hardback)
- Pages: 501
- OCLC: 2209663

Old Fort Duquesne, or, Captain Jack, the Scout is an historical novel by the American writer Charles McKnight (1826 - 1881) set in 1750s Pittsburgh, Pennsylvania. The novel tells the story of Captain Jack, a scout and Indian fighter, who is the protagonist of this retelling of the events of Fort Duquesne during the French and Indian War.
