= Rhoda Boyd =

- Born: 1748; Cumberland County, Pennsylvania
- Died: 1823 (aged 74–75); Tuscarawaras County, Ohio
- Resting place: Smiley Family Cemetery, Barr's Mill, Sugar Creek Township, Tuscarawas County, Ohio
- Known for: Captivity among Lenape
- Spouse: Thomas Robert Smiley
- Parent(s): John Boyd, Nancy Urie

Rhoda Boyd was born in rural Cumberland County, Pennsylvania in 1748 to John Boyd, immigrant from Ulster and Nancy Urie, immigrant from Scotland. Rhoda and her siblings were captured by Lenape on 10 February 1756. The Lenape killed her mother and youngest brother during the attack.

== Fates of family members ==
- Nancy (Urie) Boyd (mother), killed after the attack
- infant, possibly George Boyd, killed in the attack
- John Boyd Sr. (father), not present at the attack. He remarried, and died in 1788.
- William Boyd, oldest son, with his father and not present for the raid. He was a blacksmith in Perry County, Pennsylvania.
- John Boyd, Jr., captured and adopted by the Delaware; returned from the Delaware in later years to visit relatives, but continued to live as an Indian.
- David Boyd returned to his father by his Indian foster father, who originally captured him.
- Sarah (Sallie) Boyd, taken captive and lived with the Delaware for several years, was returned to Fort Pitt, 1764

== Later life ==
Taken captive at age eight, Rhoda lived with the Delaware for eight years, from the age of eight to sixteen, by which time she was assimilated to the band. Liberated by Colonel Henry Bouquet at the forks of the Muskingum River, she and Elizabeth Studebaker, another English colonist adopted by the Delaware, escaped from his custody on their way to Fort Pitt in Pittsburgh, and returned to the Delaware.

Rhoda Boyd was ransomed in Detroit in 1764 and taken back to the British colonists. Bouquet took her to Carlisle, Pennsylvania in 1764. There she married American Revolutionary War soldier Thomas Robert Smiley. They had children together, and the family later moved to Somerset, Pennsylvania. They eventually moved to Tuscarawas County, Ohio, where there was a settlement of Christianized Delaware. Rhoda Boyd Smiley died there in 1823.
