= Nenatcheehunt =

18th century Lenape chief

Nenatcheehunt, "Delaware George"
- Born: Tulpehocken Creek Valley, Berks County, Pennsylvania
- Died: 30 April 1762; Fort Pitt, Allegheny County, Pennsylvania
- Years active: 1742-1762
- Known for: Promoting peaceful coexistence with English colonists, negotiating the release of English prisoners
- Parent: Sister of Sassoonan (mother)

Nenatcheehunt (died 30 April 1762), also spelled Nenacheehunt, or Nenatchehan, and sometimes referred to as Menatochyand, was a Lenape chief known for participating in peace negotiations at the end of the French and Indian War. He is referred to as "Delaware George" by both George Croghan and James Kenny. Confusingly, Christian Frederick Post refers to both Nenatcheehunt and Keekyuscung as "Delaware George." It is not always clear which man is being identified, as they often attended the same meetings and events.

== Family and early life ==
He has been identified as a brother of Netowatquelemond, but he was more likely an older brother of Pisquetomen, Shingas and Tamaqua. If the latter is true, then Nenatcheehunt was born and raised in the Tulpehocken Creek Valley, in Berks and Lebanon counties, on the upper Schuylkill River, with his uncle Sassoonan (Allumapees) and his brothers. One source reports that Nenatcheehunt had six brothers (Tamaqua, Pisquetoman, Shingas, Buffalo Horn, Munhuttakiswilluxissohpon, and Miuskillamize). He was probably a son of Sassoonan's sister, and a grandson of Tamanend. After the Lenape were forced off the Tulpehocken lands in 1732, he lived for a time at Shamokin and later Kuskusky.

== Role in peace negotiations ==
On 12 July 1742 he accompanied Sassoonan to a conference in Philadelphia to resolve differences over the occupation of lands ceded under the Walking Purchase of 1737 but which the Lenape were refusing to leave, stating that the purchase had been unfairly negotiated.

Together with Keekyuscung and Scarouady, he was a participant at the Winchester Conference of September, 1753, and at the Treaty of Carlisle in November.

He and many other leaders met with George Croghan at Logstown in January, 1754. On 31 January 1754, a signed speech addressed to the Governor of Virginia was delivered by the chiefs, Tanacharison, Scarouady, Newcomer, Coswentannea, Tonelaguesona, Shingas, and Delaware George. In this message they requested the construction of a fort on the Monongahela River (later the site of Fort Pitt): "...we now request, that our Brother, the Governor of Virginia may build a Strong House at the Forks of the Mohongialo, and send some of our young brethren, the warriors, to live in it...as our enemies are just at hand, and we do not know what day they may come upon us."

He was reported to have met with George Washington in June, 1754. In his description of the meeting, William Albert Hunter refers to him as "Delaware George," while also naming Keekyuscung, who was present:

"From June 19 to June 21 the Half-King [Tanacharison] and a few of his followers joined Washington at Christopher Gist's place for an Indian conference. Having heard that the Delawares and Shawnees had turned against the English, Washington had invited the Delaware leaders to meet him; they arrived on the 18th...The chiefs present--"King" Shingas, Keekyuscung, Delaware George (Nenatcheehunt)--professed to be friendly but unable to show their feelings openly. At the close of the conference, in spite of Washington's appeals, the Indians returned to the Great Meadows."

On 21 June 1754 Washington persuaded Keekyuscung (whom he refers to as Kaquehuston) to carry letters written by French deserters into Fort Duquesne, in order to encourage other French soldiers to desert. Washington also asked Nenatcheehunt "to go and take a View of the Fort."

Nenatcheehunt was at Shamokin in October, 1755 when the Penn's Creek Massacre took place. According to historian Richard Grimes, he "fully supported the British [and]...had “not approved” the raids of Shingas and his followers from Kittanning, and was quite agitated at the group."

He was at Kuskusky in May, 1757, and at Venango in August. On July 19, a messenger from George Croghan, who had gone on to Kuskuskies, returned, by way of Venango, and brought the news "That Delaware George...was rejoyced when he heard that the English inclined to make peace." Following the signing of a peace treaty on 4 August 1757, Nenatcheehunt (referred to as Menatchyand) sent a message to Teedyuscuug: "We have heard of the good work of peace you have made with our brethren the English, and that you intend to hold it fast. We will not lift up our hatchet to break that good work you have been transacting."

On 30 August 1757, Nenatcheehunt (referred to in the minutes as Menatochyand) met with Lieutenant-Governor William Denny in Philadelphia to apologize for an attack by Delaware Indians on English settlers in which some settlers were killed. Nenatcheehunt claimed that the attack had been instigated by the French, and Denny accepted his apology.

Delaware George (probably Nenatcheehunt) met with Governor Denny again on 25 November 1757, to discuss matters related to the Conestoga people.

In November, 1758, Nenatcheehunt participated in peace negotiations with Christian Frederick Post in Kuskusky. On meeting Post for the first time, he stated that "he had not slept all night, so much had he been engaged on account of [Post's] coming."

In May, 1759, Nenatchehan expressed exasperation at his inability “to bring over all the Delawares to the British Interest” and resolved to move back to the Susquehanna if he found “any further difficulty in keeping them from the French.”

In August, 1761, he informed James Kenny, a Quaker frontiersman who was hired by Israel Pemberton Jr. to bring supplies to the Lenape and Shawnee Indians in western Pennsylvania, that he was one of the three leaders of the Lenape: "Had some conversation with Delaware George in which he informs me that ye Indians cannot settle matters among themselves...that their Nation [the Lenape] are subject to three Heads, Viz ye Beaver [Tamaqua], himself [Delaware George], and White Eyes."

== Role in securing the release of English prisoners ==
In June, 1758, Teedyuscung reported to Christian Frederick Post that "Nenacheehunt, a Chief of one of the Towns on the Allegheny, had come to him to know whether the English were willing to include him in the peace, & whether Teedyuscung desired the prisoners be returned, & being assured of both these articles, he said there were a good many prisoners in his Town, and he would take Care they should all be restored & that he & his people would come down and settle with Teedyuscung at Wyoming."

On 12 August 1758, Delaware George, Tamaqua and many other Wyandot, Shawnee and Twightwee chiefs met with Brigadier-General Robert Monckton at Pittsburgh to discuss the handover of white prisoners.

At a July 1759 meeting, Tamaqua was accompanied by Delaware George, Shingas, Keekyuscung, Killbuck, and Captain Pipe. In August, 1759, Nenatcheehunt accompanied Tamaqua and several other Lenape leaders to the newly constructed Fort Pitt to negotiate with Colonel Hugh Mercer, George Croghan and William Trent about the release of prisoners held in Lenape communities.

== Death and burial ==
Nenatcheehunt died on 30 April 1762, James Kenny recorded on 27 April that "Delaware George came here [Fort Pitt] today by water from Cuscuskeys & is carried on a blanket between four Indians from ye canoe...his days are so near expireing." On 1 May he wrote that "Delaware George Dyed last night, to be burried tomorrow." He attended the funeral on 2 May 1762:

This day Delaware George was interred over ye Allegheny River; a file of soldiers attended who fired three rounds over his grave. George Croghan and many white people attended ye burial, in ye night ye Indians shot off guns many times to ward off evil spirits.

George Croghan sent a condolence gift to Delaware George's family in May, 1762, writing that Nenatcheehunt was "much lemented by his own nation & likewise by ye White People as he was a Stedy friend to ye British Intrest."

== See also ==
- Tamaqua (Lenape chief)
- Pisquetomen
- Shingas
- Christian Frederick Post
- Keekyuscung
