= Battle of Fort Duquesne =

1758 battle during the French and Indian War

The Battle of Fort Duquesne
- Part of the French and Indian War
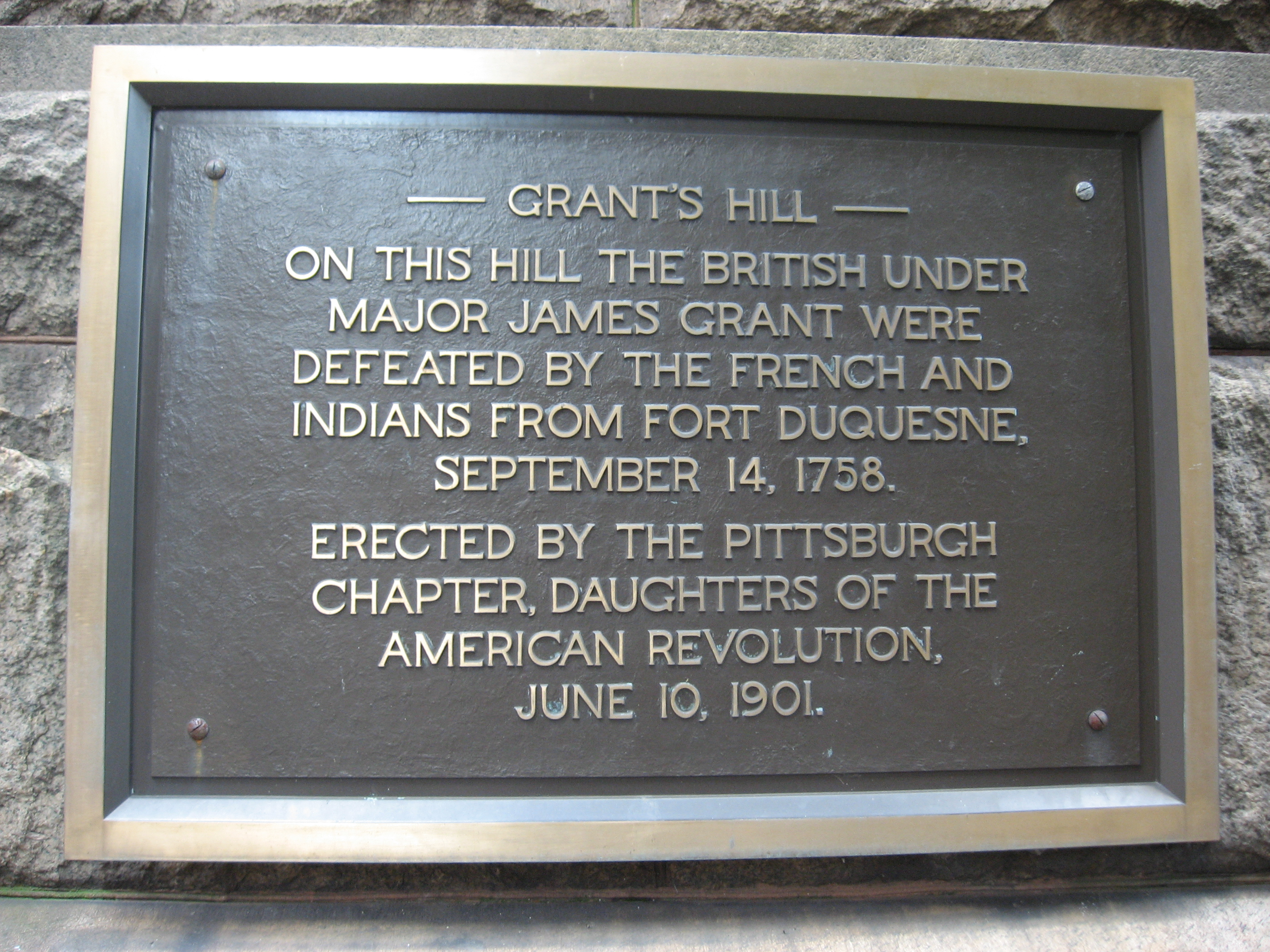
- Memorial plaque on the site of the Battle of Fort Duquesne
Date	September 14, 1758
Location	Fort Duquesne, site of present-day Pittsburgh, Pennsylvania 40°26′29.86″N 80°00′39.40″W
Result	French victory

Belligerents
France: (New France) Colony of Canada; Natives	Great Britain: British America

Commanders and leaders
François-Marie Le Marchand de Lignery	James Grant (POW); John Forbes

Strength
500 natives and militia	400 regulars 350 militia

Casualties and losses
8 killed; 8 wounded	104 killed; 220 wounded; 18 captured

The Battle of Fort Duquesne was a British assault on the French-controlled Fort Duquesne (later the site of Pittsburgh) on 14 September 1758, during the French and Indian War. This force was out-maneuvered, surrounded, and largely destroyed by the French and their native allies led by François-Marie Le Marchand de Lignery.

== Background ==
A large-scale British expedition was organised in July 1758 to drive the French out of the contested Ohio Country (the upper Ohio River Valley) and clear the way for an invasion of Canada. With 6,000 troops led by General John Forbes it also included a contingent of Virginians led by George Washington.

Having set out a road was constructed with forts and redoubtable built every forty miles. Slowly the expedition advanced, but Forbes, very ill, did not keep up with the advance of his army, but entrusted it to his second in command, Lt. Col. Henry Bouquet, a Swiss officer commanding a battalion of the Royal American Regiment. As they approached Fort Duquesne by late August, Bouquet sanctioned Major James Grant of Ballindalloch of the 77th Regiment to reconnoiter the area with 850 men.

== Battle ==
On September 11, 1758, Grant led the men to scout the environs of Fort Duquesne ahead of Forbes' main column. Bouquet believed the fort to be held by 500 French and 300 Indians, a force too strong to be attacked by Grant's detachment. Grant, who arrived in the vicinity of the fort on September 13, believed there were only 200 enemy within the fort, and sent a small party of 50 men forward to scout. These men saw no enemy outside the fort; they burned a storehouse and returned to Grant's main position, two miles (3 km) from the fort.

Grant attempted to deceive and trap the French and Native force however in doing so he fatally split his own force and allowed his corps to be defeated in detail. Grant's divided force was subsequently unable to support each other. A company of the 77th, under a Capt. McDonald, approached the fort with drums beating and pipes playing as a decoy. A force of 400 men lay in wait to ambush the enemy when they went out to attack McDonald, and several hundred more under the Virginian Maj. Andrew Lewis were concealed near the force's baggage train in the hope of surprising an enemy attack there.

The French and Indian force was in fact much larger than anticipated, and moved swiftly. They overwhelmed McDonald's decoy force and overran the party that had been meant to ambush them. Lewis's force left its ambush positions and went to the aid of the rest of the force but the French and Indians had by then gained a point of high ground above them and forced them to retire. The Indians used the forest to their advantage; "concealed by a thick foliage, their heavy and destructive fire could not be returned with any effect". In the one-sided battle in the woods, the British and American force suffered 342 casualties, of whom 232 were from the 77th Regiment, including Grant, who was taken prisoner. Out of the eight officers in Andrew Lewis's Virginian contingent, 5 were killed, 1 was wounded and Lewis himself was captured. Nevertheless, most of Grant's force escaped to rejoin the main army under Forbes and Bouquet. The Franco-Indian force suffered only 8 killed and 8 wounded.

James Smith wrote "Notwithstanding their (the Indians') vigilance, Colonel Grant, with his Highlanders, stole a march upon them, and in the night took possession of a hill about eighty rod from Fort Du Quesne; this hill is on that account called Grant's Hill to this day. The French and Indians knew not that Grant and his men were there until they beat the drum and played upon the bagpipes, just at daylight. They then flew to arms, and the Indians ran up under cover of the banks of Allegheny and Monongahela, for some distance, and then sallied out from the banks of the rivers, and took possession of the hill above Grant; and as he was on the point of it in sight of the fort, they immediately surrounded him, and as he had his Highlanders in ranks, and in very close order, and the Indians scattered, and concealed behind trees, they defeated him with the loss only of a few warriors; most of the Highlanders were killed or taken prisoners."

== Aftermath ==
Major Grant was taken prisoner and the British survivors retreated fitfully to Fort Ligonier.

Though the French had beaten off the initial British attack, Lignery understood that his force of about 600 could not hold Fort Duquesne against the main British force of more than ten times that number. The French, were also deserted by some of their native allies. They then blew up their magazines and burnt Fort Duquesne on November 24, and left under the cover of darkness. As the British marched up to the smoldering remains, they were confronted with an appalling sight. The Indians had decapitated many of the dead Highlanders and impaled their heads on the sharp stakes on top of the fort walls, with their kilts displayed below. The British and Americans rebuilt Fort Duquesne, naming it Fort Pitt after the British prime minister William Pitt, who had ordered the capture of that strategic location.

=== Legacy ===
A plaque on the Allegheny County Courthouse, erected in 1901 commemorates the site of the battle, and the hill where the battle was fought is today called Grant Street, in Pittsburgh.
