= Henry Bouquet =

British Army officer in North America

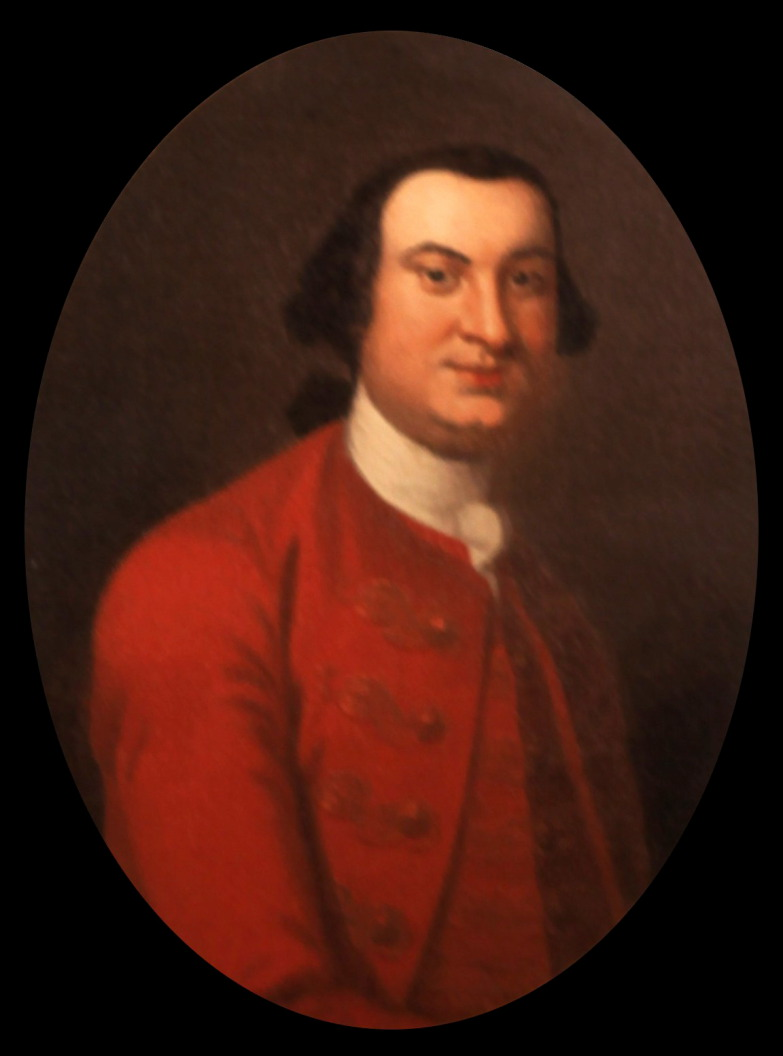
- Portrait by John Wollaston, c. 1759
- Born: Henri Louis Bouquet; 1719; Rolle, Switzerland
- Died: 2 September 1765 (aged 45–46); Pensacola, West Florida, British America
- Military career
- Allegiance: Dutch Republic (1736–1739, 1748–1755); Kingdom of Sardinia (1739–1748); Great Britain (1756–1765)
- Service years: 1736–1765
- Rank: Brigadier general (British Army)
- Units: 60th Regiment of Foot
- Commands: Fort Pitt
- Conflicts: French and Indian War; Forbes Expedition; Battle of Fort Ligonier; Pontiac's War; Siege of Fort Pitt; Battle of Bushy Run

Henry Bouquet (born Henri Louis Bouquet; 1719 – 2 September 1765) was a Swiss mercenary who rose to prominence in British service during the French and Indian War and Pontiac's War.

He is best known for his victory over a Native American force at the Battle of Bushy Run, which lifted the siege of Fort Pitt during Pontiac's War. During the conflict, Bouquet gained lasting infamy in an exchange of letters with his commanding officer, Jeffery Amherst, who suggested a form of biological warfare in the use of blankets infected with smallpox which were to be distributed to Native Americans. Despite this indictment historians have praised Bouquet for leading British forces in several demanding campaigns on the Western Frontier in which they "protected and rescued" settlers from increasingly frequent attacks.

== Early life ==
Bouquet was born in Rolle, Switzerland, in 1719. He was likely the son of Isaac-Barthélemy Bouquet, a mercenary in the service of the Kingdom of Sardinia, and Madeleine Rolaz. Like many military officers of his day, Bouquet traveled between countries serving as a professional soldier. He began his military career in 1736 in the army of the Dutch Republic, and later in 1739 joined the army of the Kingdom of Sardinia. In 1748, he was again in Dutch service as lieutenant colonel of the Swiss guards.

== French and Indian War ==
In 1756, Bouquet entered the British Army as a lieutenant colonel in the 60th Regiment of Foot (Royal American Regiment), a unit made up largely of members of Pennsylvania's German immigrant community. After leading one battalion of the Royal Americans to Charleston, South Carolina to bolster that city's defences, six companies were recalled to Philadelphia to take part in General John Forbes's expedition against Fort Duquesne in 1758. The remainder of the regiment was serving far to the north.

While Bouquet travelled down the road from Fort Bedford, his troops were attacked by the French and the Natives at Loyalhanna, near present Ligonier, Pennsylvania, but the attack was repulsed, and they continued on to Fort Duquesne, only to find it razed by the fleeing French.

== Pontiac's War ==
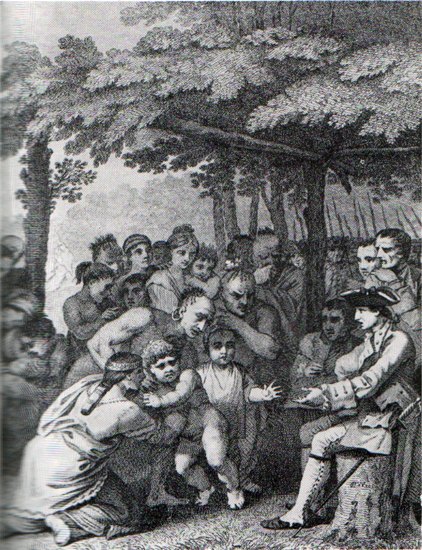
The Indians returning British captives to Colonel Henry Bouquet in November 1764.

In 1763, bands of Native Americans joined forces to remove the British from their territory in what is most often called Pontiac's War. Pontiac, an Ottawa war leader, began urging the Indian tribes that had been allied to the French during the French and Indian War to join together to continue the fight to remove the British from the territory. Pontiac initiated attacks on the westernmost frontier forts and settlements in the belief the defeated French would rally and come to their aid. The start of the conflict is usually described as the Siege of Fort Detroit, on 10 May 1763. Fort Sandusky, Fort Michilimackinac, Fort Presque Isle, and numerous other frontier outposts were quickly overrun.

Several frontier forts in the Ohio Country had fallen to the allied tribes, and Fort Pitt, Fort Ligionier, and Fort Bedford along Forbes's road were besieged or threatened. Bouquet, who was in Philadelphia, threw together a hastily organised force of 500 men, mostly Scots Highlanders, to relieve the forts. On 5 August 1763, Bouquet and the relief column were attacked by warriors from the Delaware, Mingo, Shawnee, and Wyandot tribes near a small outpost called Bushy Run, in what is now Westmoreland County, Pennsylvania. In a two-day battle, Bouquet defeated the tribes and Fort Pitt was relieved. The battle marked a turning point in the war.

It was during Pontiac's War that Bouquet gained a certain lasting infamy, when he ordered the men under his command to distribute smallpox-infested blankets from the infirmary to besieging Native Americans during the Siege of Fort Pitt in June 1763. During a parley in midst of the siege on June 24, 1763, Captain Simeon Ecuyer gave representatives of the besieging Delawares small metal boxes, containing two blankets and a handkerchief that had been exposed to smallpox, in an attempt to spread the disease to the Natives so that they would end the siege. After the end of the war, Levy, Trent and Company, of which William Trent was a member, submitted a reimbursement invoice on which was written: "To Sundries got to Replace in kind those which were taken from people in the Hospital to Convey the Smallpox to the Indians Vizt." General Thomas Gage approved reimbursement to the company. A reported outbreak that began the spring before left as many as one hundred Native Americans dead in Ohio Country from 1763 to 1764.

It is not clear, however, whether the smallpox was a result of the Fort Pitt incident, or the virus was already present among the Delaware people, as outbreaks happened on their own every dozen or so years, and the delegates were met again later and seemingly had not contracted smallpox. Smallpox was highly contagious among the Native Americans and, together with measles, influenza, chicken pox, and other Old World diseases, was a major cause of death since the arrival of Europeans and their animals.

The journal of Trent, who served the commander of the militia at the fort, has provided evidence that the plan was carried out:

[June] 24th [1763] The Turtles Heart a principal Warrior of the Delawares and Mamaltee a Chief came within a small distance of the Fort Mr. McKee went out to them and they made a Speech letting us know that all our [POSTS] as Ligonier was destroyed, that great numbers of Indians [were coming and] that out of regard to us, they had prevailed on 6 Nations [not to] attack us but give us time to go down the Country and they desired we would set of immediately. The Commanding Officer thanked them, let them know that we had everything we wanted, that we could defend it against all the Indians in the Woods, that we had three large Armys marching to Chastise those Indians that had struck us, told them to take care of their Women and Children, but not to tell any other Natives, they said they would go and speak to their Chiefs and come and tell us what they said, they returned and said they would hold fast of the Chain of friendship. Out of our regard to them we gave them two Blankets and an Handkerchief out of the Small Pox Hospital. I hope it will have the desired effect. They then told us that Ligonier had been attacked, but that the Enemy were beat of.

A month later, in a series of letters between Bouquet and his commander, General Jeffery Amherst, the idea of using smallpox blankets was proposed, and it was agreed upon to infect the Indians by giving them infected blankets. Amherst wrote to Bouquet, then in Lancaster, on about 29 June 1763: "Could it not be contrived to send the small pox among those disaffected tribes of Indians? We must on this occasion use every stratagem in our power to reduce them." Bouquet agreed, replying to Amherst on 13 July: "I will try to inoculate the Indians by means of blankets that may fall in their hands, taking care however not to get the disease myself." Amherst responded on 16 July: "You will do well to try to inoculate the Indians by means of blankets, as well as to try every other method that can serve to extirpate this execrable race."

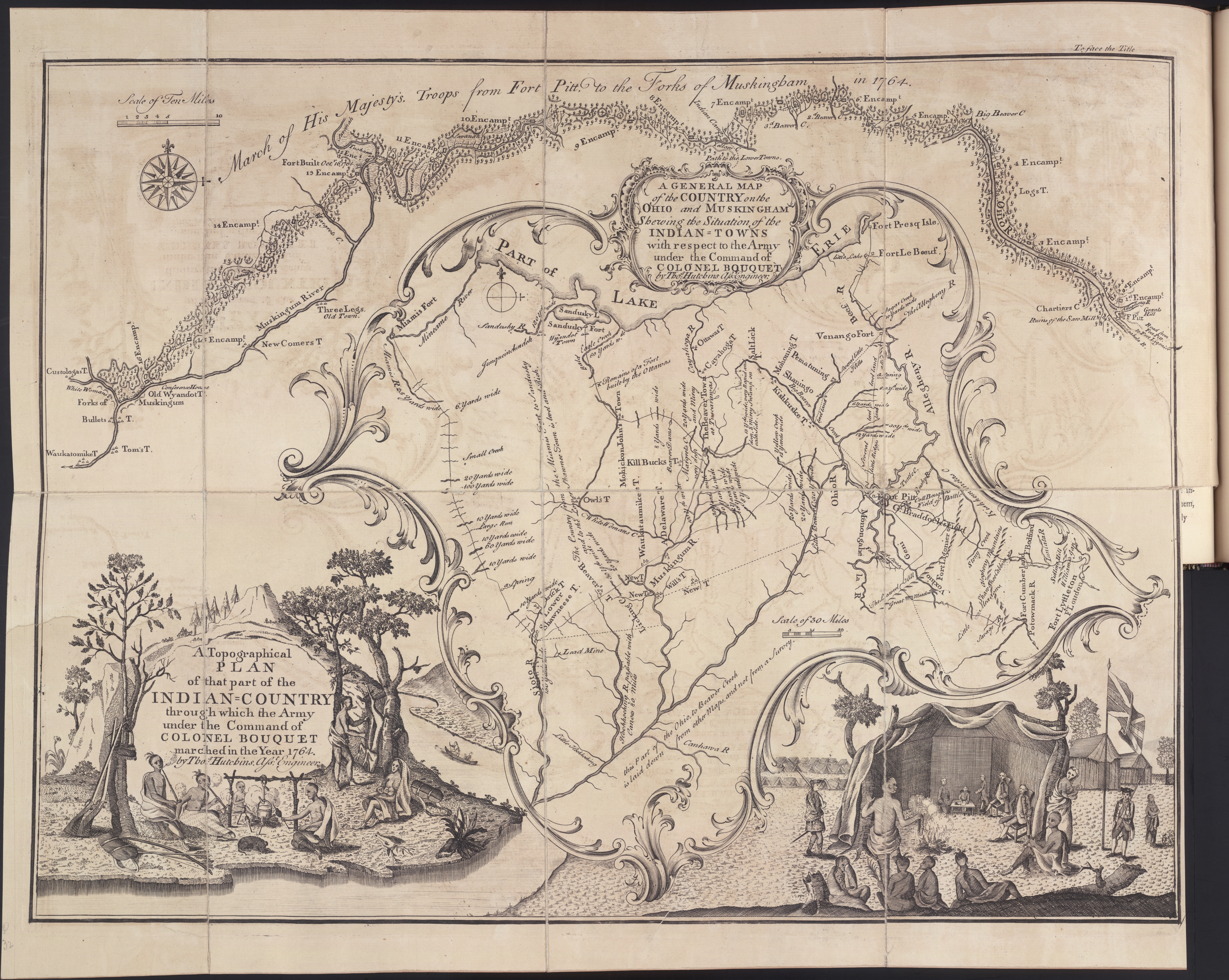
Thomas Hutchins' map of Henry Bouquet's 1764 expedition to Ohio.

By the autumn of 1764, Bouquet had become the commander of Fort Pitt. To subdue the ongoing Indian uprising, he led a force of nearly 1,500 militamen and regular British soldiers from the fort into the Ohio Country. On 13 October 1764, Bouquet's men reached the Tuscarawas River. Shortly thereafter, representatives from the Shawnees, Senecas, and Delawares came to Bouquet to sue for peace.

Bouquet then moved his men from the Tuscarawas River to the Muskingum River at modern-day Coshocton, Ohio. That placed him in the heart of tribal lands and would allow him to quickly strike the natives' villages if they refused to co-operate. As part of the peace treaty, Bouquet demanded the return of all white captives in exchange for a promise not to destroy the Indian villages or seize any of their land. The return of the captives caused much bitterness among the tribesmen because many of them had been forcibly adopted into Indian families as small children, and living among the Native Americans had been the only life they remembered. Some 'white Indians' such as Rhoda Boyd managed to escape back into the native villages; many others were never exchanged. Bouquet was responsible for the return more than 200 white captives to the settlements back east.

== Later years ==
In 1765, Bouquet was promoted to brigadier general and placed in command of all British forces in the southern colonies. He died in Pensacola, West Florida, on 2 September 1765.

== In literature ==
Bouquet is referred to in Conrad Richter's 1953 novel The Light in the Forest, which tells the story of one young man returned to his white family as part of the 1764 treaty. He is also referred to in Paul Muldoon's poem "Meeting the British", as well as in Thomas Pynchon's novel Mason & Dixon.

== In film ==
A film about the Battle of Bushy Run titled "Love, Courage, and the Battle of Bushy Run" starring Tom Connolly as Colonel Henry Bouquet was released in 2024.
