= Fort Duquesne =

Colonial fort at the confluence of the Allegheny and Monongahela rivers

Coordinates: 40°26′29.9″N 80°00′39.4″W

- Pittsburgh, Pennsylvania, U.S.
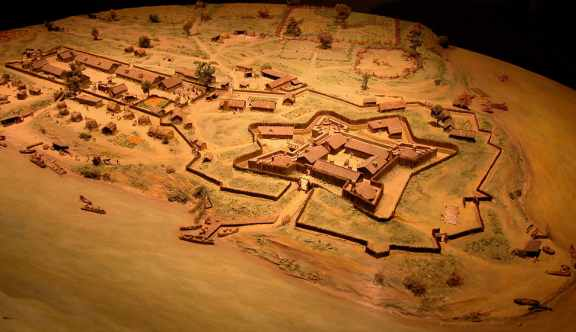
- Fort Duquesne in Pittsburgh

Site information
- Type: Fort
- Controlled by: New France; Great Britain

Site history
- Built: 1754
- In use: 1754–1758
- Battles/wars: French and Indian War

Pennsylvania Historical Marker
- Designated: May 8, 1959

Fort Duquesne (/djuː.ˈkeɪn/ dew-KAYN, French: [dykɛːn]; originally called Fort Du Quesne) was a fort established by the French in 1754, at the confluence of the Allegheny and Monongahela rivers. It was later taken over by the British, and later the Americans, and developed as Pittsburgh in Pennsylvania. Fort Duquesne was destroyed by the French before its British conquest during the Seven Years' War, known as the French and Indian War on the North American front. The British replaced it, building Fort Pitt between 1759 and 1761. The site of both forts is now occupied by Point State Park, where the outlines of the two forts have been laid in granite slabs.

== History ==
=== 18th century ===
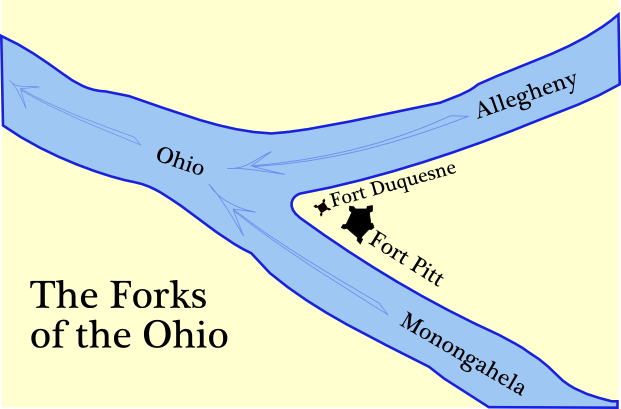
Map indicating the locations of the two forts

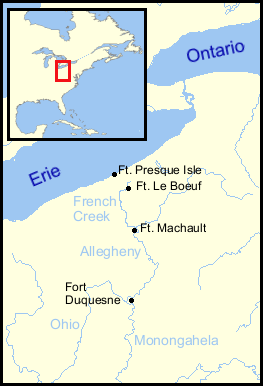
French forts, 1753 and 1754

A 1755 map clearly showing the location of Fort Duquesne at its upper edge.

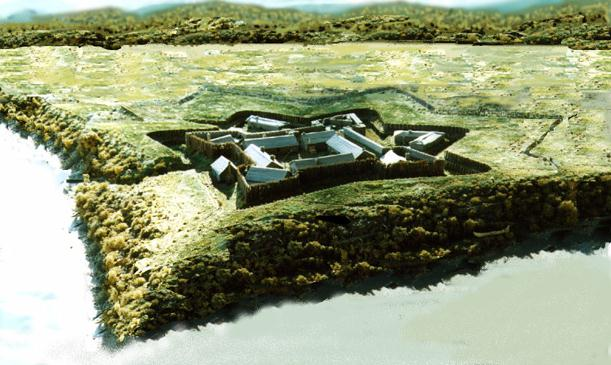
Model of Fort Duquesne

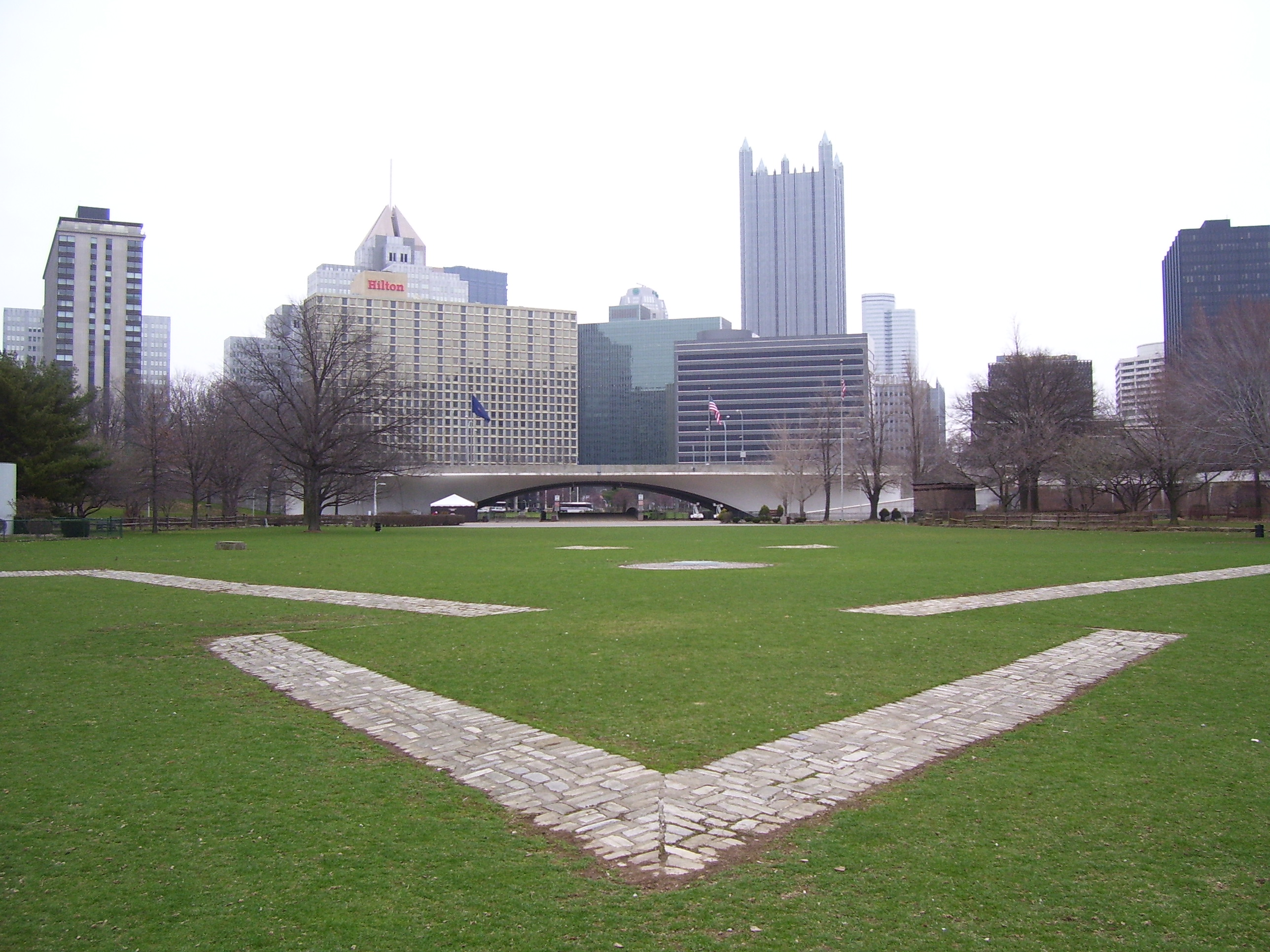
Point State Park in Downtown Pittsburgh, where bricks mark the outline of the former site of Fort Duquesne. These bricks have since been replaced by granite slabs.

Fort Duquesne, built at the confluence of the Allegheny and Monongahela rivers which form the Ohio River, was considered strategically important for controlling the Ohio Country, both for settlement and for trade. The English merchant William Trent had established a highly successful trading post at the forks as early as the 1740s, to do business with a number of nearby Native American villages. Both the French and the British were keen to gain advantage in the area.

As the area was within the drainage basin of the Mississippi River, the French had claimed it as theirs. They controlled New France (Quebec), the Illinois Country along the Mississippi, and La Louisiane, the ports of New Orleans and Mobile, Alabama.

In the early 1750s, the French began construction of a line of forts, starting with Fort Presque Isle on Lake Erie in present-day Erie, Pennsylvania, followed by Fort Le Boeuf, about 15 miles south in present-day Waterford, Pennsylvania, and Fort Machault, on the Allegheny River in Venango County in present-day Franklin, Pennsylvania.

Robert Dinwiddie, Lieutenant Governor of the Virginia Colony, thought these forts threatened extensive claims to the land area by Virginians (including himself) of the Ohio Company.

In late autumn 1753, Dinwiddie dispatched a young Virginia militia officer named George Washington to the area to deliver a letter to the French commander at Fort Le Boeuf, asking them to leave. Washington was also to assess French strength and intentions. After reaching Fort Le Boeuf in December, Washington was politely rebuffed by the French.

Following Washington's return to Mount Vernon in January 1754, Dinwiddie sent Virginians to build Fort Prince George at the Forks of the Ohio. Work began on the fort on February 17. By April 18, a much larger French force of five hundred under the command of Claude-Pierre Pécaudy de Contrecœur arrived at the forks, forcing the small British garrison to surrender. The French knocked down the tiny British fort and built Fort Duquesne, named in honor of Marquis Duquesne, the governor-general of New France. The fort was built on the same model as the French Fort Frontenac on Lake Ontario.

Washington, who was lieutenant colonel in the newly created Virginia Regiment, set out on April 2, 1754, with a small force to build a road to, and then defend, Fort Prince George. Washington was at Wills Creek in north central Maryland when he received news of the fort's surrender. On May 28, Washington encountered a Canadian scouting party near a place now known as Jumonville Glen (several miles east of present-day Uniontown). Washington attacked the French Canadians, killing 10 in the early morning hours, and took 21 prisoners, of whom many were ritually killed by the Native American allies of the British. On May 31, Washington replaced Colonel Joshua Fry as commander of the Virginia Regiment after Colonel Fry died en route to Wills Creek.

The Battle of Jumonville Glen is widely considered the formal start of the French and Indian War, the North American front of the Seven Years' War.

Washington ordered construction of Fort Necessity at a large clearing known as the Great Meadows. On 3 July 1754, the counterattacking French and Canadians forced Washington to surrender Fort Necessity. After disarming them, they released Washington and his men to return home.

Although Fort Duquesne's location at the forks looked strong on a map—controlling the confluence of three rivers—the reality was rather different. The site was low, swampy, and prone to flooding. In addition, the position was dominated by highlands across the Monongahela River, which would allow an enemy to bombard the fort with ease. Pécaudy de Contrecœur was preparing to abandon the fort in the face of Braddock's advance in 1755. He was able to retain it due to the advancing British force being annihilated (see below). When the Forbes expedition approached in 1758, the French had initial success in the Battle of Fort Duquesne against the English vanguard, but were forced to abandon the fort in the face of the much superior size of Forbes' main force.

The French held the fort successfully early in the war, turning back the expedition led by General Edward Braddock during the 1755 Battle of the Monongahela. George Washington served as one of General Braddock's aides. A smaller attack by James Grant in September 1758 was repulsed with heavy losses.

Two months later, on November 25, 1758, the Forbes Expedition under the Scotsman General John Forbes took possession of Fort Duquesne after the French destroyed and abandoned the site.

== Present-day site ==
Fort Duquesne was built at the point of land of the confluence of the Allegheny and Monongahela Rivers, where they form the Ohio River. Since the late 20th century, this area of Downtown Pittsburgh has been preserved as Point State Park. The park includes a brick outline of the fort's walls, as well as outlines to mark the later Fort Pitt.

Archaeological observations and rescue excavations were undertaken at Point State Park in 2007 by A.D. Marble & Company, a Cultural Resource Management firm from eastern Pennsylvania. Two buried features were encountered in the vicinity of the site of Fort Duquesne that may relate to the fort. A stone-capped brick drain lay close to the location of a Fort Duquesne ravelin and was traced over a distance of 27 feet. One such conduit or drain was mentioned in 1754 construction accounts by Contrecoeur. The builder's trench (trench originally dug into subsoil to construct the drain) yielded only redeposited prehistoric artifacts and brick and mortar fragments, indicative of an early historic date of construction. Alternatively, it is possible the brick drain relates to later eighteenth or early nineteenth century occupation of the site.

The second feature was a refilled pit containing five archaeological strata to a depth of about three feet. These strata contained redeposited Late Woodland and Late Prehistoric artifacts and early historic objects that included three wrought iron nails, three small glass fragments, eight lead musket shot and one glass bead. Animal bones included those from deer, dog and cattle (or possibly bison). The early historic date of this pit and its location south of Fort Duquesne argue for association with the fort. The pit may on the other hand be a remnant of the "epaulement" (presumably earthen outwork) constructed west of Fort Pitt shown on the 1761 Bernard Ratzer map.

Data from the archaeological project strongly suggest that two to three feet of original lower terrace surface may have been removed across this portion of the park, which would probably have destroyed most of the ditch that once surrounded Fort Duquesne. Traces of fort elements that extended more deeply into the ground such as large vertical posts that formed the western half of the fort walls in addition to magazines and drains are more likely to have survived.

== Commemoration ==
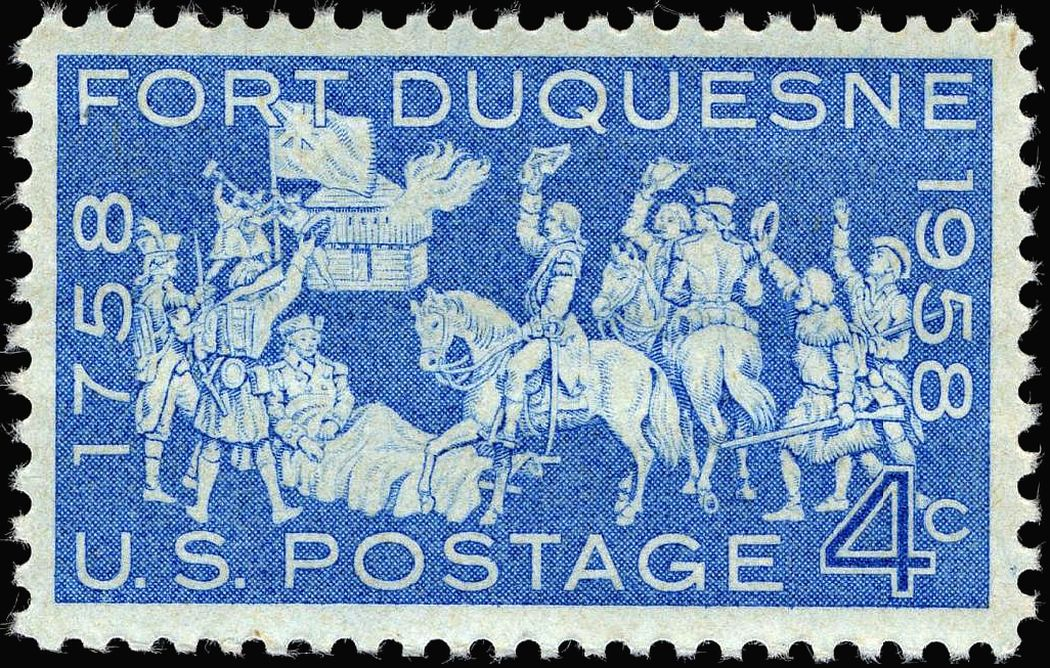
Fort Duquesne commemorative stamp, 1958 issue

On November 25, 1958, the 200th anniversary of the capture of Fort Duquesne, the U.S. Post Office issued a 4-cent Fort Duquesne bicentennial commemorative stamp. It was first released for sale at the post office in Pittsburgh. The design was reproduced from a composite drawing, using various figures taken from an etching by T.B. Smith and a painting portraying the British occupation of the site as the Fort Duquesne blockhouse burns in the background.

Colonel Washington is depicted on horseback in the center, while General Forbes, who was debilitated by intestinal disease, is shown lying on a stretcher. The stamp also depicts Colonel Henry Bouquet, who was second in command to the ailing Forbes, and other figures who represent the Virginia militia and provincial army.

== In media ==
Fort Duquesne is the subject of, or referenced, in:

- In 1873, Fort Duquesne is the subject of Old Fort Duquesne, a historical novel by Charles McKnight, which retells the role of Fort Duquesne during the French and Indian War.
- In 2012, Assassin's Creed III features Fort Duquesne long after the British rebuilt it. It is one of the main forts in the game that Connor has to conquer to reclaim it for the Continental Army.
- In November 2016, Fort Duquesne appeared in Episode Seven of the first season of the NBC television series Timeless.
- In 2020, Age of Empires III: Definitive Edition features Fort Duquesne being captured by the French in the beginning of the French and Indian War.

== See also ==
- Great Britain in the Seven Years' War
- France in the Seven Years' War
- List of French forts in North America
- Battle of Fort Duquesne

== Bibliography ==
- Anderson, Fred. Crucible of War: The Seven Years' War and the Fate of Empire in British North America, 1754–1766. New York: Knopf, 2000. ISBN 0-375-40642-5.
- Blades, Brooke with contributions by Bruce Bevan, Bryan Butina, Pam Crabtree, Dennis Dirkmaat, Alan Dorfman, Pat Fall and Lisa Lavold, Christine Gill, Darden Hood, William Johnson, Frank Mikolic, Frank Vento, Stephanie Walker and Chad Yost. "Archaeological Investigations at Point State Park, City of Pittsburgh, Allegheny County, Pennsylvania". A.D. Marble and Company, Conshohocken, Pennsylvania, April 2009. Copies filed with A.D. Marble and Bureau for Historic Preservation, Pennsylvania Historical and Museum Commission and with Department of Conservation and Natural Resources, Harrisburg.
- Hunter, William A. Forts on the Pennsylvania Frontier, 1753–1758. Originally published 1960; Wennawoods reprint, 1999.
- Stotz, Charles Morse. Outposts Of The War For Empire: The French and English In Western Pennsylvania: Their Armies, Their Forts, Their People 1749–1764. Pittsburgh: University of Pittsburgh Press, 2005. ISBN 0-8229-4262-3.
- Withers, Alexander Scott; Draper, Lyman Copeland (1895). Chronicles of Border Warfare. Stewart & Kidd Company.
