= Robert Callender (frontiersman) =

18th century Pennsylvania fur trader and soldier

- Born: 1726; Ireland
- Died: July 29, 1776 (aged 50); Carlisle, Pennsylvania
- Burial place: Carlisle, Pennsylvania
- Military career
- Branch: British Army: 1st Battalion, Pennsylvania Regiment
- Service years: 1756-1757, 1763, 1774-1776
- Rank: Colonel
- Commands: Carlisle Fort
- Conflicts: French and Indian War: Kittanning Expedition; Forbes Expedition; Pontiac's War American Revolutionary War

Robert Callender (ca. 1726 – July 29, 1776) was a frontiersman and a soldier, becoming one of the most prominent fur-traders in colonial Pennsylvania. He fought in the French and Indian War and took part in the Kittanning Expedition. He was commander of Carlisle Fort, participated in the Forbes Expedition, and was commissioned colonel at the start of the American Revolutionary War. Because of his knowledge of trails and terrain in Pennsylvania, his advice was sought by George Washington, John Forbes, and Henry Bouquet. He died at age 50 in 1776.

== Birth and early life ==
Little is known about Callender's early life, as most of his papers were destroyed in a house fire in Carlisle. Many sources report that he was of Scottish descent, born in Ireland, and that he immigrated to North America as a young man. At least one source reports that he was born in Chester County, Pennsylvania.

== Career as a fur trader ==
Callender may have started trading furs in Pennsylvania as early as 1748. In 1749, he entered into a business partnership with George Croghan, William Trent, and Michael Teaffe. After about 1750, Callender maintained a mill and two homes in Carlisle, Pennsylvania, including an estate at Middlesex Township and a second home at Silver Spring. He conducted much of his trade there, with the intent of making Carlisle a center for the Pennsylvania fur trade.

On February 22, 1750, Callender was a signatory of a treaty drawn up by George Croghan, without authorization from the Pennsylvania governor. Croghan, Andrew Montour, Christopher Gist, and Callender were in Pickawillany, where they were greeted warmly by the Twightwee (Miami) residents, who told Croghan that they "desired that they might be admitted into the alliance of the English; that thereupon, Mr. Montour and he (though they had no authority from the Governor), rather than discourage these people at so critical a time...drew up an instrument which was executed on both sides."

In January 1751, Callender traveled with Croghan, Gist, and Montour to the Ohio village of Lower Shawneetown to establish trade relations with the Shawnee and other Ohio tribes. In June 1752, a warehouse owned by Croghan, Trent, Callender, and Teaffe was destroyed during the attack on Pickawillany, and its contents looted. Callender probably lost goods worth over £1000. He later interviewed one of the only white survivors of the attack, Thomas Burney, when Burney reached Carlisle.

By late 1753, Callender was operating at least three trading houses, one each on the Muskingum and Scioto rivers and a third on Beaver Creek in what is now Fayette County, Pennsylvania. At the outset of the French and Indian War in 1754, the fur trade was disrupted by fighting and Native American raids on Pennsylvania settlements. In April 1754, Callender was trading furs on the Allegheny River and delivered a message to Ensign Edward Ward at Fort Prince George, warning him that a large force of French troops and Native American warriors was approaching the fort. A warehouse full of goods owned by Croghan, Trent, Callender, and Teaffe (valued at over £2500) was captured when French troops took the fort on April 18, 1754. At about the same time, the warehouse shared by Trent, Croghan and Callender at Lower Shawneetown was confiscated by the Native American residents, who were under threat from the French to stop trading with the English. Soon after this, Callender's business relationship with Trent ended and he began supplying the British Army with horses, provisions, animal feed, and other materials.

== Military career ==
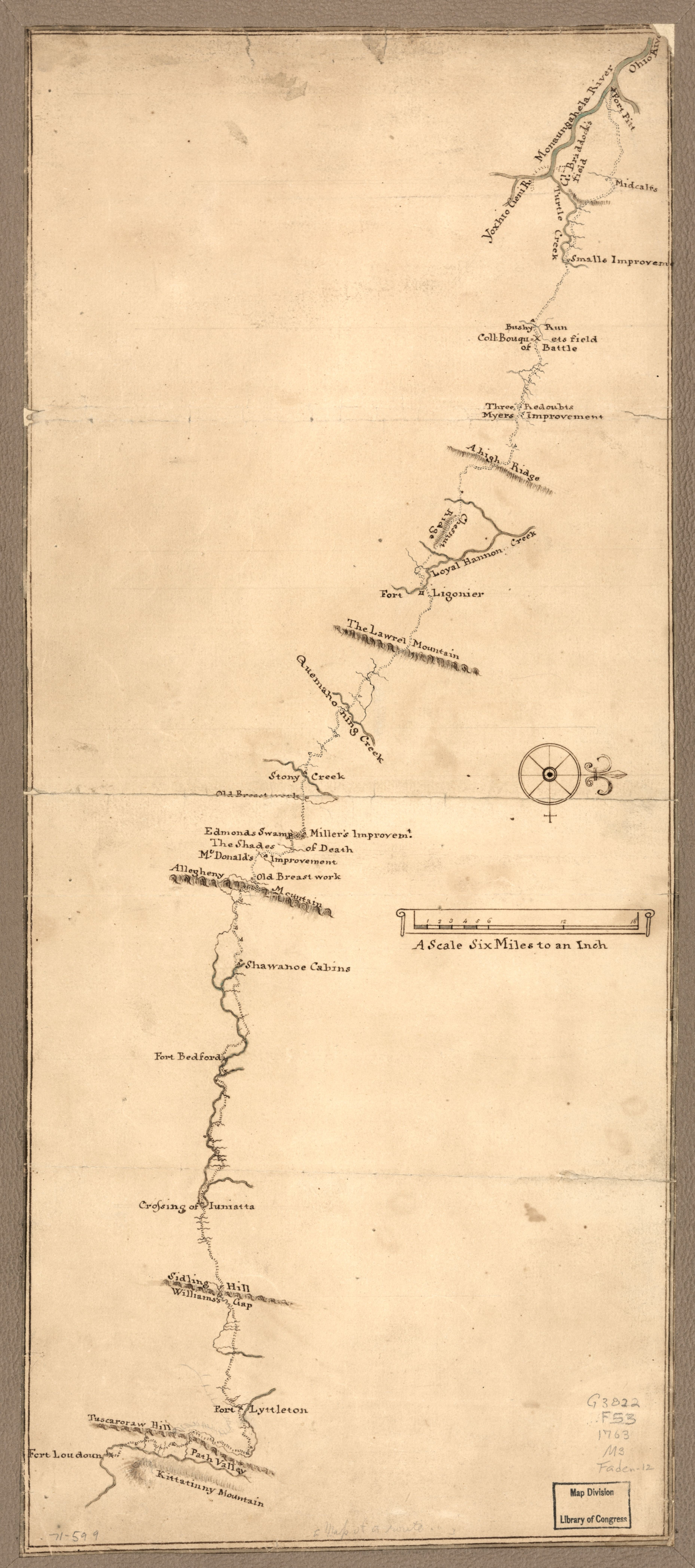
Callender probably contributed to this 1763 pen and ink map of Henry Bouquet's route through western Pennsylvania.

Callender's sale of horses and equipment to the army brought him in contact with officers who needed experienced frontiersmen to do scouting and reconnaissance, as he had traveled most of the trade routes across western and central Pennsylvania. In October 1755, George Washington offered Callender a military commission in exchange for Callender's assistance in recruiting "some likely young fellows, acquainted with the woods". In January 1756, Callender was commissioned a captain lieutenant in the 1st Battalion of the Pennsylvania Regiment. His knowledge of trails and terrain in Pennsylvania was of great value to Major John Armstrong in planning a raid that required troops to cross a largely unmapped region. Callender may have drawn or contributed to two of the best-known maps of the Pennsylvania frontier, both produced in 1756.

=== Kittanning Expedition ===
In September, Callender took part in Armstrong's Kittanning Expedition, which attacked the village of Kittanning, a staging-area for Lenape raids against Pennsylvania settlements, and destroyed it, killing the Lenape war chief Captain Jacobs. Callender reportedly set fire to Jacobs' house, forcing Jacobs to try to escape from a cockloft, where he was killed. In a letter to Governor Thomas Penn, the Reverend Thomas Barton wrote about the event:

"One Mr. Callender, who at that Time bore only a Lieutenant's Commission, distinguish'd himself by the most uncommon Bravery & Resolution. It is asserted that when Jacobs took to a House, out of which he kill'd & wounded Many of our Men, Callender undertook to fire it, which he accomplish'd at the infinite Hazard of his Life; And that when our People precipitately retreated upon a Report prevailing that the French were to be up that Day from Fort Duquesne, Callender not content to leave the Houses standing, went back with a small Body of Men, & set Fire to them all."

As a reward for his heroism, Callender was given a captain's commission, and in October 1756, he was given command of Carlisle Fort. His captain's commission was renewed in December 1757.

=== Forbes Expedition ===
Callender was in charge of transporting military supplies during the Forbes Expedition. On June 21, 1758, Henry Bouquet wrote to General John Forbes: "Captain Callender would be the most suitable man in America for the work I am having him do (that is, as wagon-master general); he is equally useful in other ways because of his energy and his knowledge of the country." In another letter in August, Bouquet mentioned "Callender, the most knowing man for the Roads & Situation." General Forbes assigned Callender to determine the best route for his army to use to cross the Allegheny Ridge, when marching to Fort Duquesne. Callender was active in scouting and even suggested a route where a road could be built, to move supplies quickly through the terrain.

Callender's position as Wagon-Master General was challenging, as food, ammunition and other supplies had to be transported to troops in 23 forts across Pennsylvania, in addition to supplying troops as they advanced towards Fort Duquesne. This required Callender to oversee enormous numbers of horses, wagons and drivers, employed almost constantly, and often under attack. In July 1759, Callender's supply train for the army included 1,100 pack horses, but due to the demands on them to transport supplies, by August, 420 of these horses were no longer able to work because of saddle-sores. In April 1760, Callender sent a report to Bouquet accounting for a total of 1,643 horses lost, killed or "retired" due to illness. In May 1760, Callender wrote to Bouquet noting that it had been difficult to maintain these horses due to the demanding schedule and the many injuries and fatalities suffered during attacks by the French and Native Americans. By then, only 120 horses had survived from the previous year.

=== Pontiac's War ===
Between 1760 and 1763, Callender took a leave of absence from the army to attend to his businesses, but at the start of Pontiac's War in 1763, he was re-commissioned as a captain and took charge of supply transports. In June 1763, Bouquet ordered Callender to transport ten horses loaded with gunpowder to Fort Bedford, but because no troops were available to escort this valuable shipment, he ordered Callender to recruit local settlers to accompany the powder to the fort.

== Bloody Run and the Indiana land grant ==
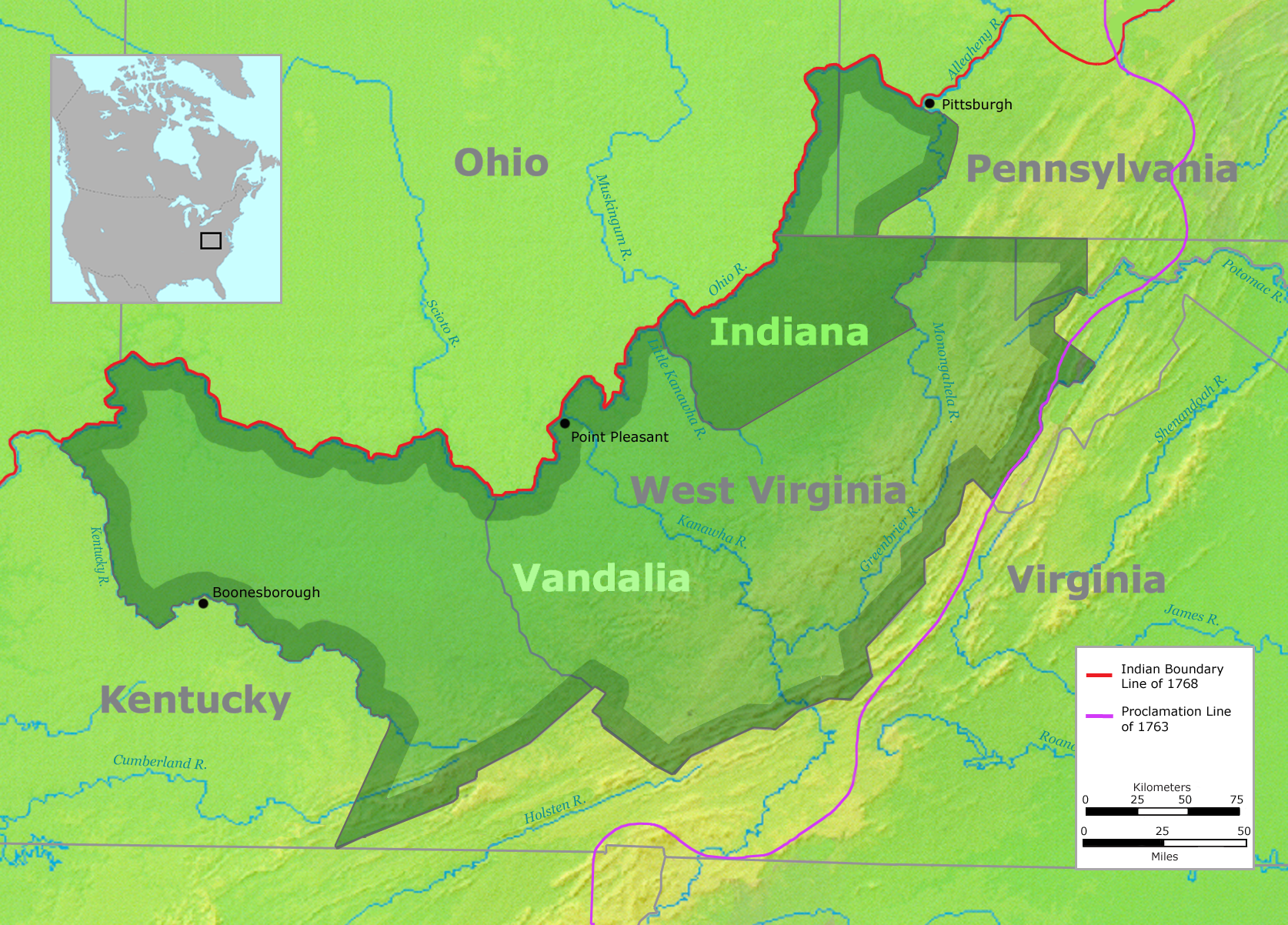
The "Indiana grant" in relation to the proposed colony of Vandalia.

By 1762, Callender was obtaining so many skins and furs through trade that he had trouble finding enough wagons to transport them to Philadelphia for sale. In early 1763, at the start of Pontiac's War, Callender was in a group of 22 traders accompanying a pack train of trade goods that was attacked by Shawnee, Huron and Lenape warriors on a stream ("Bloody Run") south of Pittsburgh, and their goods (valued at almost £86,000) were stolen. This event essentially ruined William Trent and a number of the other "suffering traders". Trent, Callender and others were able to obtain compensation from the Six Nations in the form of a land grant at Fort Stanwix in 1768. The so-called "Indiana" grant included 200,000 acres between the Allegheny Mountains and the Ohio River, from Kittanning, Pennsylvania to the Tennessee River, where the traders proposed to create a colony called "Vandalia." However, the British government opposed the acquisition of Native American lands by private individuals, and the land grant's ownership was contested in court by Lord Hillsborough, Colonial Secretary and President of the Board of Trade. After the start of the American Revolutionary War, the matter went to court in Virginia, where it was again rejected. Appeals continued unsuccessfully until long after Callender's death.

== The Black Boys Rebellion ==
In 1765, Callender purchased a quarter share in Baynton, Wharton, and Morgan's trading venture with Pennsylvania Native Americans, which proved highly profitable for both Callender and for the town of Carlisle. Callender became good friends with two of the agents employed by Baynton, Wharton, and Morgan, but in 1766 he left the company to form his own, becoming their chief competitor in the Pennsylvania fur market. Callender became Carlisle's primary employer, contracting people to manufacture shirts and 150 kegs for rum, which he traded for furs.

Residents of Carlisle became angry when they learned that Native Americans who had killed Pennsylvania settlers were now receiving rum, gunpowder and lead in exchange for furs. The Royal Proclamation of 1763 forbade unregulated trade with Native Americans, and barred the sale of weapons or liquor, although traders like Croghan and Callender continued to trade these items for furs. There was so much pressure on Callender to discontinue his trade with Native Americans that in March 1765, he wrote angrily to Henry Bouquet: "If speedy measures are not taken to suppress these people, I shall sell every foot of land I have in the county and go somewhere else, as I think no man's property is secure here as affairs are at present."

In March 1765 Croghan put together a pack train of 80 horses loaded with goods intended for Native Americans in the Ohio River Valley. Due to the rough terrain, pack horses were preferred as each could carry roughly 200 pounds of goods. Thomas Gage, then Commander-in-Chief of North America, had intended to send gifts to Native American leaders as a peace offering, but Croghan added many items at his own expense, including a large quantity of rum, which he planned to use to obtain land rights from Native Americans in the Ohio Country. Callender led the pack train, and when, on March 5, a vigilante group known as the Black Boys, led by frontiersman James Smith, intercepted it at Sideling Hill, west of the Great Cove, he allowed them to inspect the contents of a wagon that had no contraband in it. Smith permitted the pack train to continue, but the next day Smith and his men halted the pack train a second time. When the drivers refused to submit to an inspection, Smith killed some of their horses and burned some of the goods, except for the rum, which was preserved as evidence that Croghan was violating the 1763 Proclamation. The loss of £30,000 worth of goods devastated Croghan financially.

Callender offered a reward of £10 for the arrest of any of the Black Boys, and on September 20, 1769, men under orders from Callender tried to arrest James Smith as he was traveling near Fort Bedford. Shots were fired and a bystander was killed. Smith was arrested, but members of the Black Boys rescued him from jail. He was then tried for murder and acquitted.

== Land holdings ==
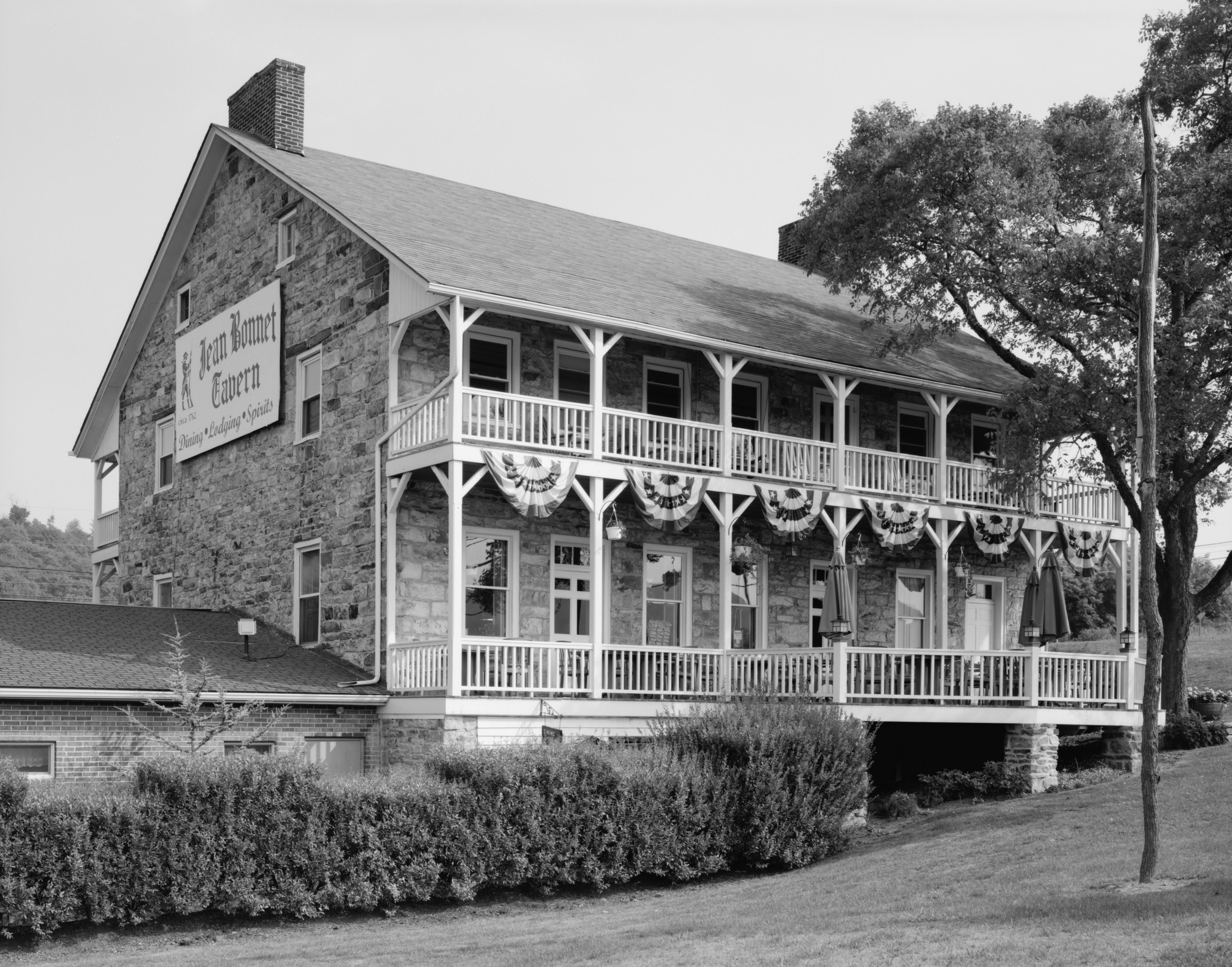
The Jean Bonnet Tavern in 2005.

In 1762, Callender purchased land outside of Bedford, Pennsylvania, where he built a stone building, intended to be a safe haven for settlers passing through the area, as well as a trading post. This building later became the Jean Bonnet Tavern and was used as a gathering place by local farmers, protesting during the 1794 Whiskey Rebellion.

In 1768, Callender purchased 2000 acres outside of Natchez, Mississippi. By 1770 he owned over 3300 acres in Cumberland and Bedford counties, and in the Juniata Valley. His Middlesex estate consisted of 459 acres and a sawmill and a grist mill, located at the confluence of the LeTort Spring Run and Conodoguinet Creek in Middlesex Township.

== Interactions with Native Americans ==
Following the Treaty of Fort Stanwix in 1768, lands in what is now West Virginia and Kentucky were opened up to settlement, through an agreement with the Haudenosaunee Confederacy. The Shawnee were not part of the treaty negotiations and were angry that their traditional hunting grounds had been ceded to white settlers. In April 1771, Callender wrote to Governor Thomas Penn warning him that Shawnee warriors had attacked and robbed fur traders in Ohio, and that "they complain that the Six Nations sold the Lands that was gave them for their Hunting Ground, & that they never received any part of the Purchase Money." This tension would lead to Lord Dunmore's War in 1774.

The next day, Callender wrote to Joseph Shippen Jr., reporting that he had met with Lenape leaders Killbuck and his son Gelelemend, who were asking for "assistance from His Majesty...that they may Establish Schools among them for Educating their Children, & Ministers for Preaching the Christian Religion...and Consequently annex them by the Strongest Ties to the English Interest." Callender supported this plan and was concerned that white settlers had made threats against the Lenape, adding: "I hope you will...Consider the Safety of these Wretches."

== Family ==
Callender married his first wife, Mary Scull (granddaughter of Nicholas Scull II) in 1749. She died at age 33 in 1764 or 1765. They had three daughters, Ann, Elizabeth and Isabella. In March 1766, Callender remarried to Frances Gibbson (aunt of John Bannister Gibson) and had four children with her.

In 1772, Callender's daughter Ann married William Irvine, a physician who later served as a brigadier general in the American Revolutionary War. Callender's daughter Elizabeth married John Andrews, an Episcopal priest, in 1772.

== American Revolutionary War ==
Callender was given a colonel's commission in 1774, at the start of the American Revolutionary War, and served with the Cumberland County Associators. He also served on the Committee of Observation. He was still listed as a colonel until September 1776, two months after his death.

== Death and burial ==
Callender died on July 29, 1776, and was buried beside his wife Mary in the Old Graveyard in Carlisle. His tombstone there reads: "Robert Callender. The testimony of a good conscience was his reward, the love and esteem of all good men his glory. On the 29th day of July, 1776 he died as he had lived, an honest man, aged 50 years."

== Popular culture ==
Callender was played by Brian Donlevy in the 1939 film Allegheny Uprising, a fictionalized portrayal of the Black Boys Rebellion.
