= Carlisle Fort =

18th century fort in Pennsylvania

- Carlisle, Pennsylvania

Site information
- Type: Fort
- Controlled by: Commonwealth of Pennsylvania

Location
- Location of Carlisle Fort in Pennsylvania
- Coordinates: 40°12′09″N 77°11′42″W

Site history
- Built: 1757
- In use: 1757-1758
- Battles/wars: French and Indian War

Garrison information
- Past commanders: Lieutenant Colonel John Armstrong; Captain Robert Callender
- Garrison: 12-50 men plus officers; Militia or provincial troops

Pennsylvania Historical Marker
- Designated: 1961

Carlisle Fort, also known as Fort Carlisle, the Fort at Carlisle, Fort Lowther or Fort Louther, (Note: There is no evidence that the name "Fort Lowther" was used until long after the fort was abandoned. It appears to honor Sir William Lowther, 1st Baronet, of Marske, who married a daughter of William Penn.) was a stockade built in the town of Carlisle, Pennsylvania during the French and Indian War, for local defense. The fort also served as a supply depot and a military headquarters during the Forbes Expedition in 1758. It was one of the first forts authorized for construction by Governor Robert Hunter Morris in 1755, although construction took almost two years to complete. It was never attacked, and was abandoned after 1758.

== Background ==
At the beginning of the French and Indian War, Braddock's defeat at the Battle of the Monongahela left Pennsylvania without a professional military force. Lenape chiefs Shingas and Captain Jacobs launched dozens of Shawnee and Delaware raids against British colonial settlements, killing and capturing hundreds of colonists and destroying settlements across western and central Pennsylvania. In late 1755, Colonel John Armstrong wrote to Governor Robert Hunter Morris: "I am of the opinion that no other means of defense than a chain of blockhouses along or near the south side of the Kittatinny Mountains from the Susquehanna to the temporary line, can secure the lives and property of the inhabitants of this country."

== History ==
A temporary stockade had been built in Carlisle before 1753, and was briefly garrisoned with about a dozen militia. In May 1753, John O'Neal wrote to Governor James Hamilton describing this stockade: "The Garrison here consists only of twelve men. The Stockade originally occupied two acres of ground square, with a blockhouse in each corner; these buildings are now in ruin."

Attacks by Native Americans led authorities to propose a more permanent structure in which residents could take refuge during an attack. Following Braddock's Defeat in early July 1755, Governor Morris spent several weeks in Carlisle, supervising the defenses and the construction of the fort, writing on July 17, 1755: "I have laid out a place in the middle of this town which the inhabitants intend to fortify with logs as a retreat for their women and Children in case they should be attacked." On July 31 he wrote to Thomas Penn: "I...returned to Philadelphia having at the request of the people laid the Ground for a Wooden Fort in the Town of Carlisle...the people being much disheartend and inclining to quit their plantations, I encouraged them to Act with resolution in their own defence and formed four Companies of Militia to whom I distributed some Powder and Lead."

=== Description ===
The fort was built on the west bank of LeTort Spring Run, which runs through Carlisle. An 1841 history of Carlisle describes the fort:

"Oak logs about seventeen feet in length, were set upright in a ditch dug to the depth of four feet. Each log was about twelve inches in diameter. In the interior were platforms made of clapboards, and raised four or five feet from the ground. Upon these the men stood and fired through loop-holes. At each corner was a swivel gun which was occasionally fired to let the Indians know that such kind of guns were within. Three wells were sunk within the line of the fortress,...the third...was for many years known as the "King's Well."

A 1758 plan of the fort shows it as a square about 130 feet (40 m) on each side, with bastions at each corner. Fourteen unidentified buildings are depicted inside the stockade.

=== Garrison ===
While the fort was under construction, the older stockade was garrisoned by fifty militia recruited by Governor Morris in July, however they were disorganized and unreliable, according to a letter from John Smith to Isaac Norris on November 3, 1755: "We have built a Small Stockade here but it will avail but little in Case an Enemy appears, having neither Order nor any One that can be depended on, every one fearing the other will flee in Case of an attack."

In October and November a large quantity of powder, lead and gunflints was sent to the garrison, as well as 150 rifles, "for the use of the Inhabitants of Carlisle." As construction continued, two swivel guns with powder and lead were sent to Carlisle on April 6, 1756. On April 16, a detachment of 30 provincial regulars was temporarily posted in Carlisle, but they were transferred to Harris' Ferry in May. Lieutenant Colonel John Armstrong recruited a company of troops for Carlisle, and they began ranging the territory between Carlisle and Fort Augusta.

When Commissary General James Young arrived at Carlisle on July 17, he found only sixteen soldiers in town, as the rest were out on patrol. Concerned that provincial troops would not be sufficient to guard the town, he urged the town's residents to supplement the fort's garrison with their militia and to put sentries outside the fort "to prevent being Surpriz'd," but the townspeople dismissed his fears. In August, Carlisle became the headquarters for the 2nd Battalion of the Pennsylvania Regiment, under Armstrong's command, and the 1st and 2nd companies were stationed there.

=== Military history ===
Native American raids in central Pennsylvania led much of the population to flee into local towns. On February 15 1756, William Trent wrote from Carlisle to Richard Peters: "all the People have left their Houses betwixt this and the Mountain, some come to Town and others gathering into little Forts." Construction was still in progress when Colonel Armstrong wrote to Governor Morris on August 20:

"Lyttelton, Shippensburg, and Carlisle (the two last not finished) are the only Forts now built, that will in my Opinion be Serviceable to the publick...The Duties of the Harvest has not admitted me to finish Carlisle Fort with the Soldiers, it should be done, and a Barrack erected within the Fort, otherwise the Soldiers cannot be so well governed and may be absent or without the Gates at a time of the greatest necessity."

In October 1756, Captain Robert Callender was given command of Carlisle Fort.

The barracks had not been built, as troops were billeted elsewhere in the town, but Armstrong felt that summoning troops to the fort during an attack would delay its defense. Construction of the fort was nearly completed in early 1757. On February 28 1757, the Reverend Thomas Barton wrote to Thomas Penn: "At Carlisle they have erected a large Stockade Fort, which I hope will be proof against any Attacks that can be made with Musquetry."

In May 1757, reports of French troops operating south of Fort Duquesne led John Stanwix to station five companies of the 2nd Battalion of the Royal American Regiment in Carlisle. Expecting an assault, the troops prepared entrenchments and breastworks on the northeast edge of the town. Six more companies of the Royal American Regiment arrived in September. Stanwix proved a capable commander, demanding good quality food for his troops, obtaining abundant supplies of powder and shot for his men, and negotiating with a war party of Cherokees who had come to Pennsylvania to fight against other tribes, but who were willing to accept pay in return for scouting and reconnaissance duties. Stanwix was annoyed that, because the fort had no barracks, troops were living in the empty homes of partially-deserted Carlisle, writing to Lord Loudoun in October 1757: "two Companies of Col. Armstrong's Provincial Battalion lies at this Beggerly place where one half of the few houses are uncover'd & deserted & the rest scarce able to cover these two Comp[anies]." Some troops camped outside the town at a spot known as "the Camp at Carlisle," or Camp Stanwix.

In 1758, Stanwix was ordered to build a supply depot at Carlisle, large enough to hold supplies for the upcoming Forbes Campaign. He was instructed to build several buildings: one 90 by 30 feet, another 30 by 40 feet, and at least one more 20 feet square. These buildings were later incorporated into Carlisle Barracks.

=== Abandonment, 1758 ===
In early 1758, Carlisle became an assembly point for troops preparing for the Forbes Expedition. In June and July, the greater part of the troops stationed there marched out towards Fort Duquesne, and Carlisle Fort was effectively abandoned. By 1762, it had been dismantled. Remains of the breastworks built by the Royal Americans were still visible in 1841.

Stanwix's camp outside Carlisle was enlarged in 1760, and was used to train troops until late 1764.

== Carlisle Barracks ==
Some of the buildings in Carlisle used for troops and as storage were refurbished during the American Revolutionary War, and the Hessian Powder Magazine was built in 1777. These buildings subsequently became part of Carlisle Barracks in 1794.

== Memorialization ==
A historical marker was placed near the site of the fort in 1961 by the Pennsylvania Historical and Museum Commission. It reads:

"First fort authorized by Pennsylvania. Laid out by Gov. Morris, July, 1755, "in the middle of this town," on news of Braddock's defeat. Col. John Armstrong's headquarters till 1758. Called "Fort Lowther" by some later writers."
