= Fort Juniata Crossing =

18th century fort in colonial Pennsylvania

Coordinates: 40.00222°N 78.267873°W

- Bedford County, Pennsylvania, USA
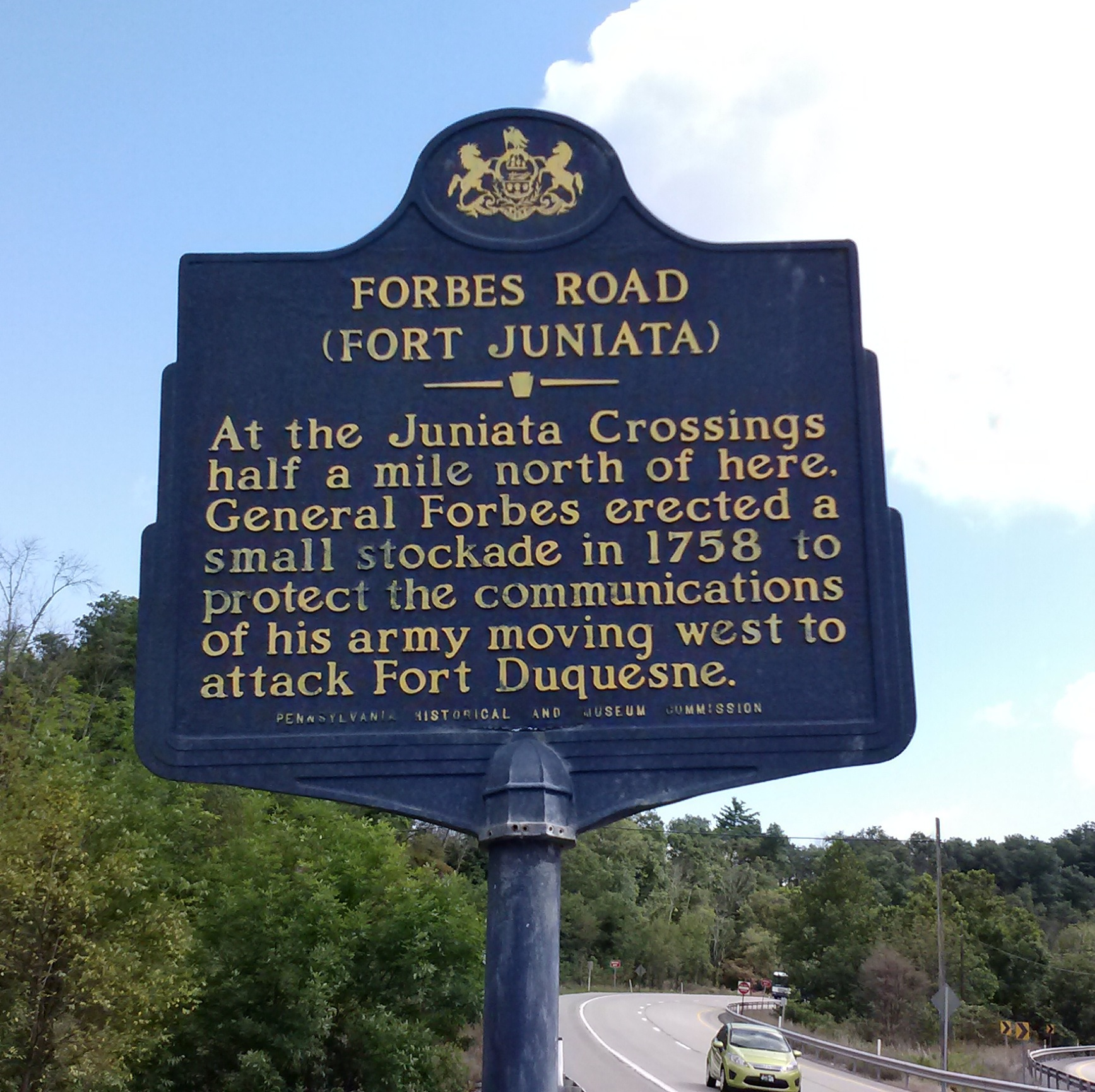
- Historical marker for "Fort Juniata" and the Forbes Road, near Breezewood, PA.

Site information
- Type: Fort

Location
- Location of Fort Juniata Crossing in Pennsylvania

Site history
- Built: 1758
- In use: 1758-1763
- Battles/wars: French and Indian War; Pontiac's Rebellion

Garrison information
- Past commanders: Captain Jacob Morgan; George Woods
- Garrison: 9-13 men

Pennsylvania Historical Marker
- Designated: 1952

Fort Juniata Crossing, also known as Fort Juniata or simply Juniata Crossing, was a British French and Indian War era fortification located along the Forbes Road, near a strategic ford of the Raystown Branch of the Juniata River about 2.4 miles (3.9 km) west of the current site of Breezewood, Pennsylvania. It was built in 1758 as a fortified supply depot, to support the British Army during the Forbes Expedition. After the campaign, it fell into disrepair and was abandoned in 1763.

== Location ==
Located about halfway between the British fortifications at Fort Lyttleton to the east and Fort Bedford to the west, Fort Juniata Crossing protected a vital ford across the Raystown Branch of the Juniata River. As this was the only major river ford along the road between Carlisle and Fort Duquesne, the site was of particular strategic importance. Colonel Henry Bouquet, General Forbes' principal lieutenant on the campaign, chose the site of the fort, writing:

"The Road from Littleton to Seydeling Hill [sic] is good but the Juniata still has 4 1/2 feet of water. We can ford it in a few days, but as a precaution we will build a bridge. The farther I go away from the settlements the more I see that this expedition, which is believed so easy, is full of almost insurmountable difficulties."

== Construction and garrison ==
The fort was constructed in the summer of 1758 as part of a string of forts located along the line of supply and communication, westward from the British Army's forward base at the frontier settlement of Carlisle, as General Forbes' army pushed toward the French at Fort Duquesne. Under the command of Captain Jacob Morgan, and with the supervision of engineer Captain Harry Gordon, construction was started on 21 June and completed on 13 July 1758.

Forbes had intended the fort to be "a stockaded inclosure for the security of the convoys and to hold the river crossing if unfordable." On 21 June 1758 Colonel Bouquet wrote to Forbes: "...arrived here this morning and found only three and a half feet of water in the river. Captain Gordon has laid out a stockade to hold 100 men...The post will suffice as a protection for the detachments necessary for escorts and to maintain the communication." Michael Lindenmuth, a soldier with the Second Battalion, Pennsylvania Regiment, camped at Juniata Crossing on 21 June and says in his journal that 200 men were engaged in the construction of the fort. Smaller, and with a smaller garrison than larger forts such as Fort Bedford and Fort Ligonier, Fort Juniata Crossing consisted of a log stockade with four bastions, surrounding a barracks 200 feet long and four storehouses on the west side of the river. Two reservoirs were dug out along the river to facilitate the collection of water.

On 23 July, soon after the fort was completed, army chaplain Thomas Barton, attached to the Third Battalion of the Pennsylvania Regiment, stopped at Juniata Crossing, writing in his journal: "Reach'd Juniata Crossing that Night--distant from Sidling Hill 9 miles. Here we found Captain Morgan encamp'd with some companies of the Pennsylvania Regiment. A small Fort just erected, & the Ford of Juniata piquetted in, in order to protect Waggons etc. in passing."

Initially, 700 men were assigned to guard the fort, as it contained supplies essential for the Forbes Expedition, but this number was significantly reduced following the campaign. By November, 1760 the garrison was reduced to one sergeant and 8 soldiers.

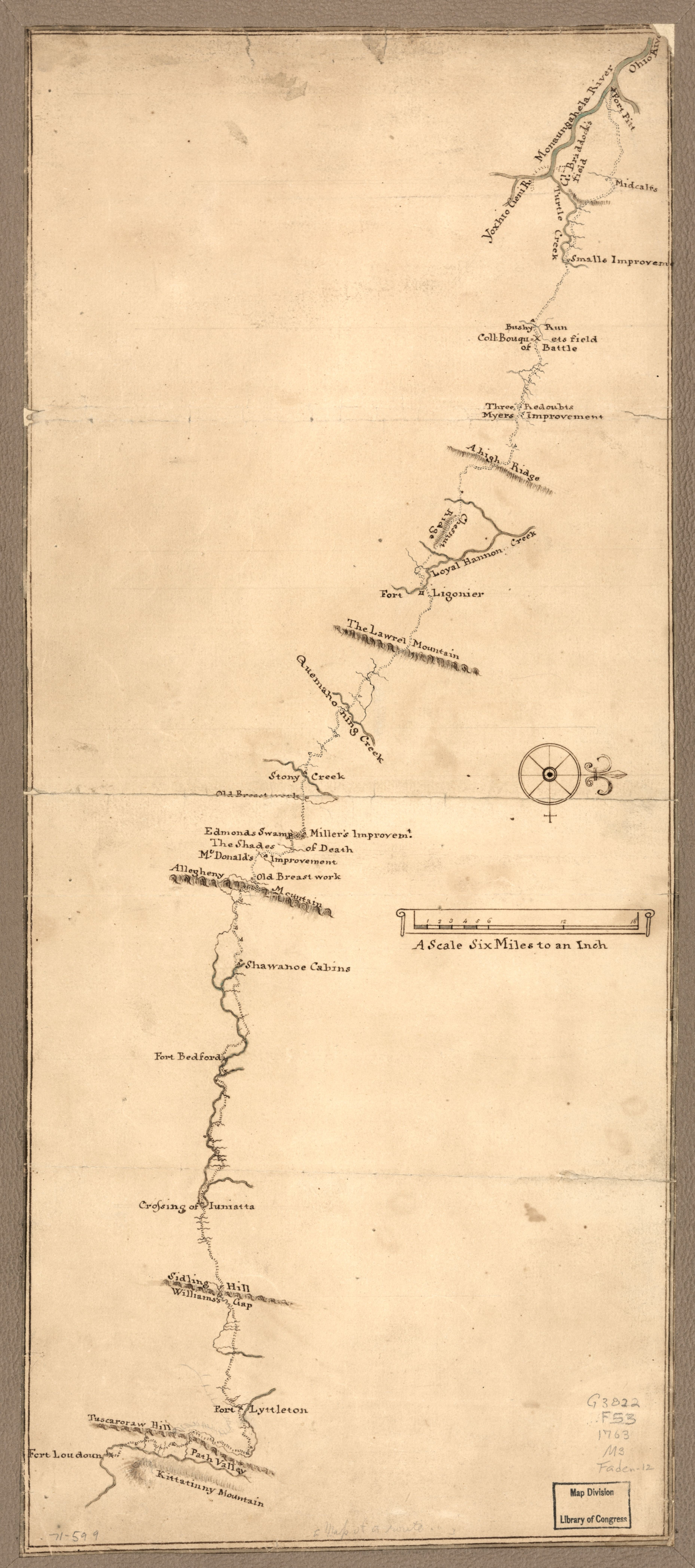
1763 map of a route through southwest Pennsylvania from Fort Loudoun, Franklin County to Fort Pitt, Pittsburgh. "Crossing of Juniata," where the fort was located, is shown near the bottom of the page.

== Pontiac's War ==
The fort was of little use to the British Army after the campaign and immediately went into a state of decline. George Woods, a local surveyor placed in command of the garrison at the fort, attempted to repair it in anticipation of attacks during Pontiac's War, but was unable to do so. He and his men finally took refuge in Woods' home instead. On 4 July 1763, He wrote to Colonel Bouquet:

"The Indeans is playing on us in all quartrs I have been at this post with two Regilrs and four Vollenters this week Pas and on the arrivl of the Hilenders. Capt Ourry sent us two More and Mr Croghan sent five of his Vollenters, the whole amounts to 13 men, which if We had any Place to Defind ourselves I think we Cold stand a smart attick, but the fort being all out of Repair, we have took to My house and prepaird it as well as possable to Difend ourselves."

When Colonel Bouquet arrived at the fort on 26 July, he wrote to General Jeffery Amherst: "The little Post of Juniata being totally decayed, & having no Time to repair it, I have evacuated it."

== Abandonment, 1763 ==
In 1763, Fort Juniata Crossing and the nearby stockade at Stony Creek were abandoned and the personnel and stores were transferred to Ford Bedford. The fort's remaining buildings were destroyed by a fire set for entertainment by wagon-drivers in May, 1764. The road continued to be in use by army supply wagons going to the newly constructed Fort Pitt and later by settlers traveling west.

== Later years ==
=== Fort Martin ===
A Revolutionary War era stockade named Fort Martin was constructed on or near the site in the late 1770s. The exact location of the fort is unknown, but it was in West Providence township, Bedford County, about halfway between Fort Lyttleton and Fort Bedford, near the former Fort Juniata Crossing. It has been described as a "blockhouse or rendezvous for the settlers in that vicinity, constructed with the private funds of the owner of the property," (Colonel James Martin), and was a refuge for local settlers during raids by Native American war parties. It fell into disuse after the war ended and the threat of raids was over, although as late as 1789, Martin's tavern was still serving veal cutlets and trout. Remains of Martin's home at the crossing were still visible in 1970.

=== Chain bridge ===
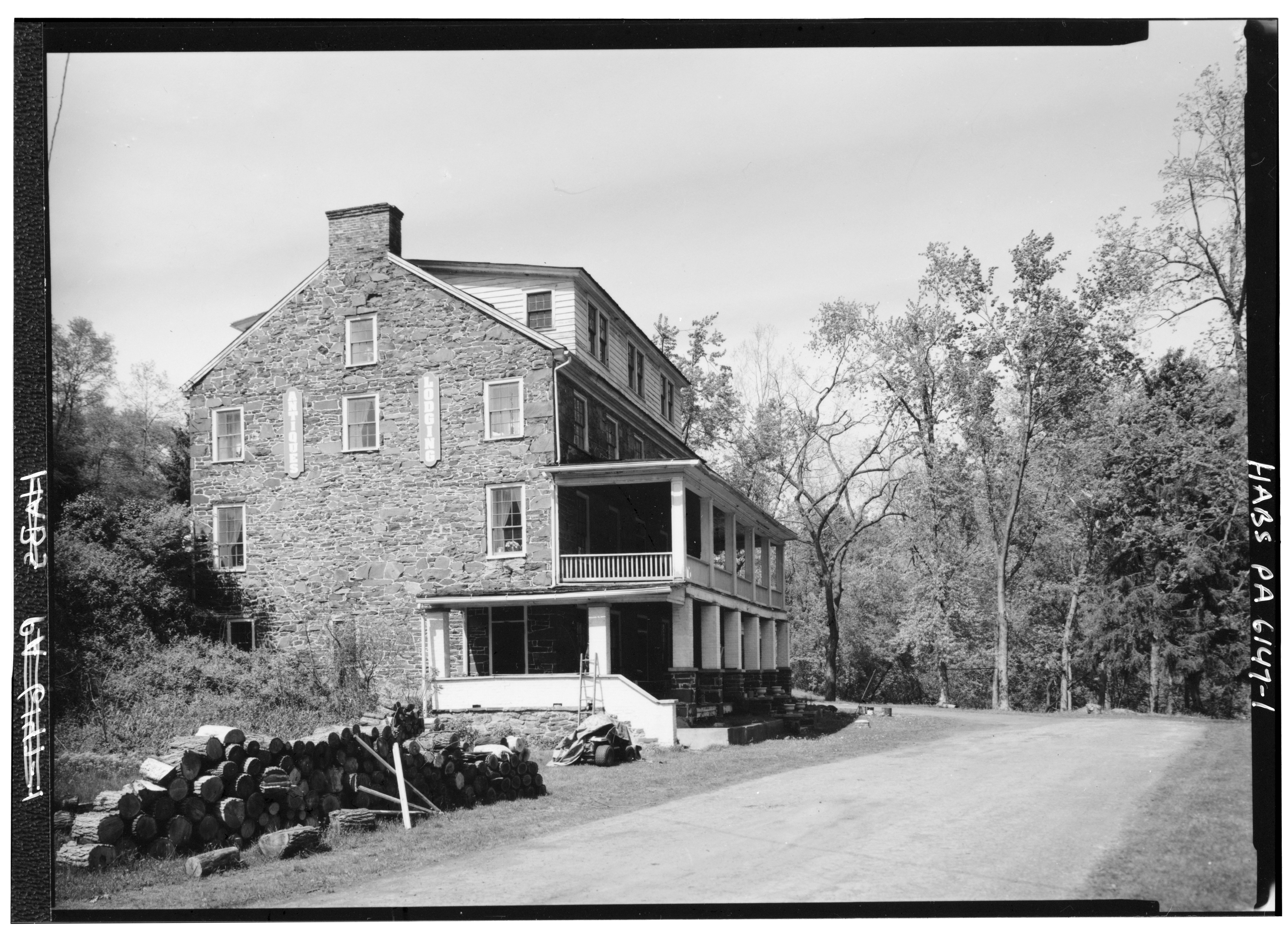
Tavern at Juniata Crossing, about 1933.

By 1790 the road was moved to a location near the present site of U.S. Route 30 in Pennsylvania, and this portion of the roadway fell into disuse, but in September, 1794 the Pennsylvania Legislature authorized William Wallace to erect a bridge across the Juniata at his own expense. He was permitted to collect tolls on condition that he allow travelers to ford the stream if they wished to do so. The wooden "chain bridge" was completed in 1801 by James Finley, Fayette County lawyer turned engineer, and was described as "...supported by two strong chains, hung in the manner of a slack rope, over the tops of posts (one at each end), about twenty feet higher than the road." The chains were anchored to boulders in the hillside above the riverbanks. The bridge was demolished some time after 1818, but the bridge's stone piers are still visible. A tavern built in 1818 is still in use as an antique shop.

== Legacy ==
In 1952, the Pennsylvania Historical and Museum Commission erected a historical marker along Route 30, about a half mile south of the fort's location.

== See also ==
- Forbes Road
- Forbes Expedition
- Fort Lyttleton
- Fort Bedford
- Pennsylvania forts in the French and Indian War
