= Fort Bedford =

Historic military fortification in Pennsylvania, USA

Coordinates: 40.0199°N 78.5038°W

Fort Bedford was a French and Indian War-era British military fortification located at the present site of Bedford, Pennsylvania. The fort was a star-shaped log fortress erected in the summer of 1758.

== Background ==
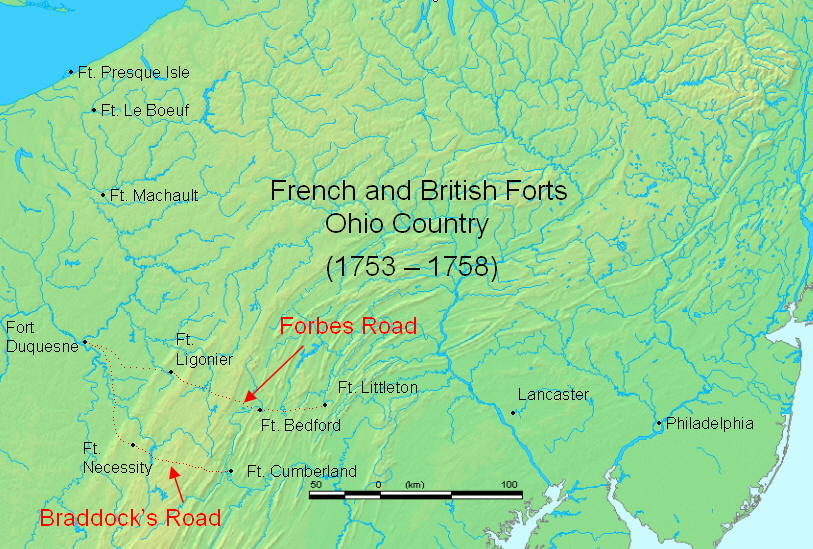
Location of Fort Bedford

Fort Bedford was constructed during the French and Indian War by British troops under the command of Colonel Henry Bouquet by order of General John Forbes. The fort was one of a string of British forts and blockhouses designed to protect British supply lines on the Forbes Road, a pioneer trail cut through the Pennsylvania frontier wilderness by the British during their invasion of the Ohio Country and campaign against the French garrison at Fort Duquesne, modern day Pittsburgh.

After General Edward Braddock's campaign to take Fort Duquesne at the Forks of the Ohio ended in disaster, General Forbes was placed in command of a new expedition to capture the strategic point guarded by Fort Duquesne. Forbes vowed not to make the same mistakes as his predecessor.

Braddock had led a small invasion force launched from western Maryland. His poorly defended lines of supply and communication were soon compromised. Forbes intended to launch a large invasion from eastern Pennsylvania by hacking a new pioneer wagon road over the Allegheny Mountains. His plan called for a string of forts and blockhouses to guard the supply road from hostile bands of Native Americans.

After constructing Fort Juniata Crossing near present Breezewood, Pennsylvania, Colonel Bouquet began planning Fort Bedford as the next step towards the Ohio Country.

== Location and construction ==
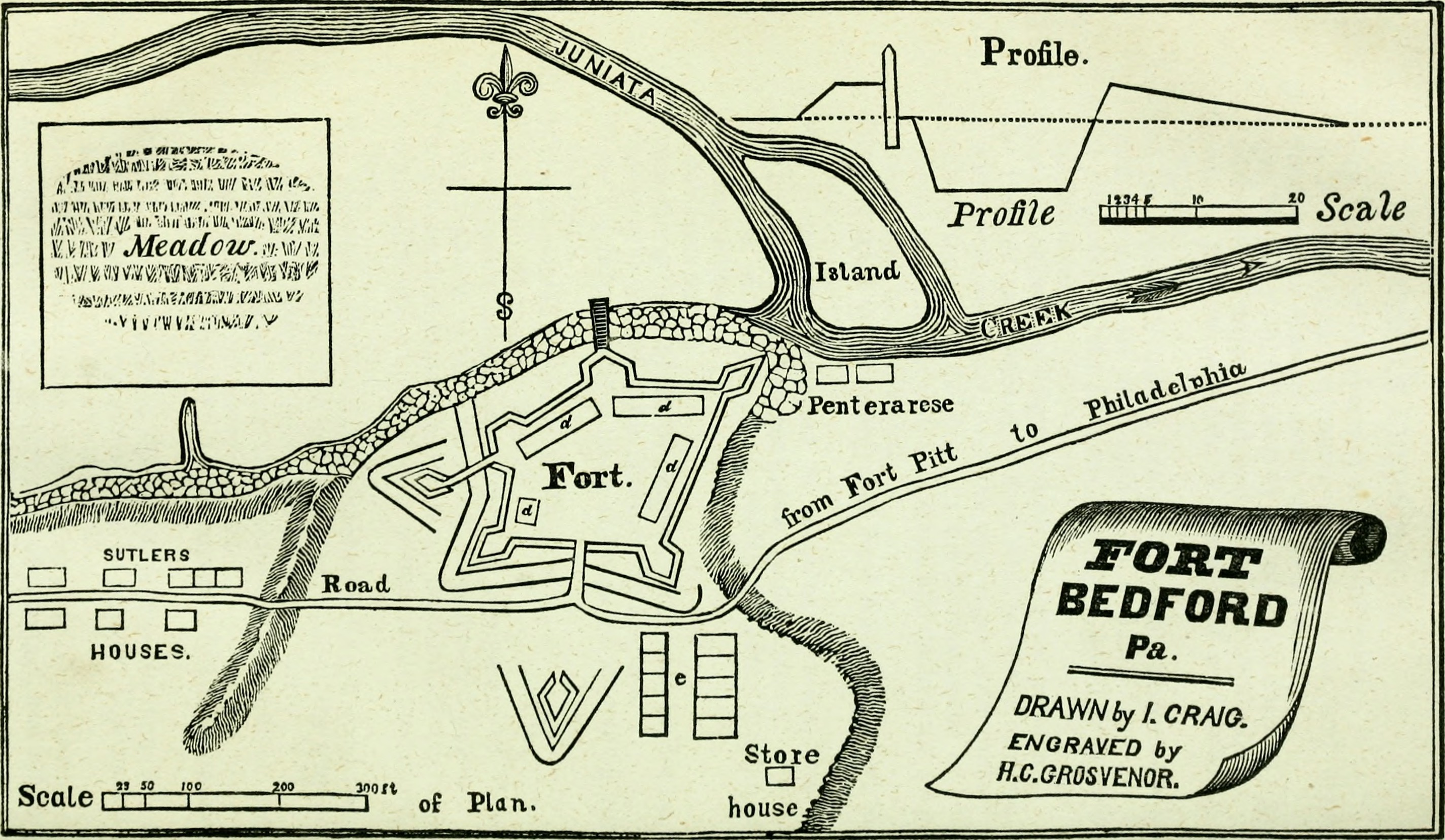
Sketch of Fort Bedford

Bouquet chose a spot adjacent to the Juniata River west of a strategic gap in the Evitt Mountain called "the Narrows". Keeping with the overall plan, the new site was about one day's march from the previous fort. John Wray's trading post was located just west of the Narrows. The new fortification was laid out on a bluff above a branch of the Juniata River about a mile west of Wray's trading post (known as 'Raystown'). Being the most noteworthy site, in the region, the new fortification was referred to as either the "camp at Raystown" or the "camp near Raystown". The new fortified supply depot was eventually dubbed Fort Bedford in honor of John Russell, the 4th Duke of Bedford.

Bouquet searched the area for some time to find a site that was both defensible and had access to fresh water. Since he could find no spot in the area with both these characteristics, the builders placed the fort on a high spot and devised an innovative fortified elevated gallery that provided access to and water from the Juniata River. It is believed that Fort Bedford was the only fort ever constructed in America with this arrangement.

The exact location of the fort has been lost to history. Archaeological digs have located evidence of the stockade walls to suggest the fort's site just north of present-day Pitt Street and west of Richard Street. Period documents including the Amherst Map of 1758 and the Lukens Survey of 1766 have helped to identify the possible site of the fort.

The fort was a log star-shaped fortress with five bastions. The walls enclosed an area of approximately 1.45 acres (5,900 m^{2}). The main gate was located on the south side of the structure and was protected by an earthen ravelin. The north side, which faced the river, featured the unique gallery to the riverbank. The non-river sides were protected by a ditch estimated at between 4 and 9 feet (1.2 to 2.7 m) in depth.

Fort Bedford's powder magazine has been identified to have existed on the site currently listed as 111 S. Juliana Street. The building at that site consists of the original half-timber two-story structure which has been determined to have been built in 1758, concurrent with the construction of the fort. It has been identified as the only existing man-made structure associated with the French and Indian War in the continental United States of America. A log addition was constructed onto the east wall of the half-timber structure at some time between 1789 and 1811. An additional wood frame structure was constructed onto the east wall of the log structure at some time in the 1830s.

== Military history ==
Fort Bedford has been described as the "Grand Central Station of the Forbes campaign" during the French and Indian War. It was used as a staging ground and central storage area for the British Army's push westward towards the French garrisons. Colonel Bouquet and General Forbes used it as their headquarters for portions of the campaign. After the bulk of the army moved westward, the fort was garrisoned by about 800 men. The fort saw little action during the war and was used mainly as a forward supply base.

As the French and Indian War wound down in the frontier, the fort's garrison was moved to other forts. Captain Lewis Ourry, in command of the fort at the outbreak of Pontiac's War, listed just twelve Royal Americans on his roster to guard the fort and more than 90 local families. Despite the weakness of the garrison, the fort was not directly attacked by native warriors. Instead they raided several local settlements and attacked supply trains bound for the fort, apparently hoping to starve out the garrison. The arrival of reinforcements under Colonel Bouquet in July 1763 ended most of the local raiding.

Details of the fort during the inter-war years are sketchy and controversial. The British Army abandoned the fort sometime during this period. According to the autobiography of James Smith, leader of a colonial movement known as the "Black Boys", he and his men captured the fort in 1769. This incident is documented only in Smith's autobiography, so it may be a tall tale, although historian Gregory Evans Dowd (War Under Heaven: Pontiac, the Indian Nations, & the British Empire, 2002) notes that there is some corroborating evidence, and that some other historians believe the tale to be true. Smith called this the first British fort to fall in the era of the American Revolution. The incident was portrayed in the 1939 Hollywood film Allegheny Uprising, starring John Wayne as James Smith.

The tale, presented only by James Smith himself, is confuted by the following evidence.

In October 1766, Garrett Pendergrass petitioned John Penn, the Provincial Governor for compensation for the use of his property. In his petition, Pendergrass claimed that "since the King's Troops evacuated that Fort, and the Avenues thereof..." In 1769 when James Smith attacked the fort to illegally free some legally arrested individuals, Fort Bedford was no longer a British Fort. The court records of Cumberland County maintain absolutely no records of Smith's capture of the 'British Fort'. No one knew that the fort had been captured until thirty years later when Smith published his self-congratulatory autobiography. If James Smith and the Black Boys did indeed attack Fort Bedford in 1769 ~ three years after the British troops evacuated it ~ then they attacked an empty fort.

The fort was garrisoned by the Patriot-sympathizing Bedford County militia during the Revolutionary War. The fort guarded the frontier settlers against raids by British-led Seneca warriors. During the period from 1777 through 1783, Sir Guy Johnson, commandant of Fort Niagara, sent British Lieutenants to attack and harass the settlers on the Pennsylvania frontier. The lieutenants would take a platoon (between 5 and 25 British soldiers) and head southward through the Genesee Valley of present-day New York State. There, they gathered scores of Seneca warriors. They traveled into Northumberland, Bedford and Westmoreland Counties. They would attack an isolated farmstead, kill the husband, and take the wife and children captive. That would goad the local militia out to search for them and the British-led party would then ambush the militia. The purpose of such incursions was primarily to capture militia officers ~ who could be used as trade for their own imprisoned officers.

== Decline and reconstruction ==
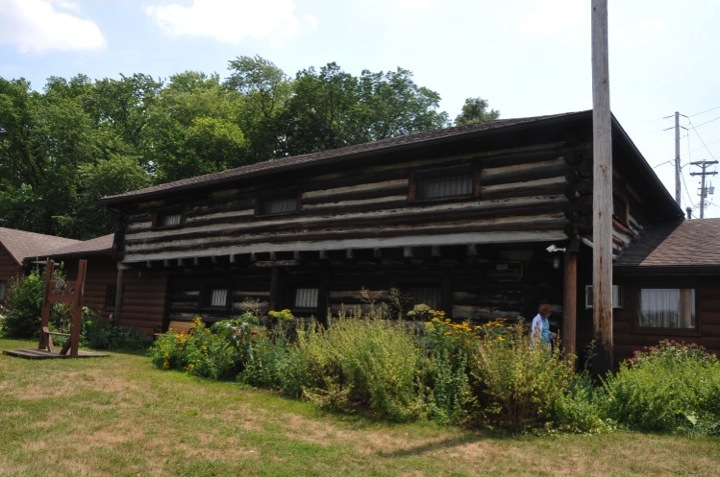
Reconstruction of the Fort Bedford blockhouse, 2015.

After the American War of Independence ended, the treaties of the 1780s such as the Treaty of Fort Stanwix and the Treaty of Fort McIntosh reduced the fear of Indian raids in the area of the fort. Sometime during this period, the fort was abandoned and demolished. George Washington stopped at the town of Bedford while leading troops into Western Pennsylvania to put down the Whiskey Rebellion in 1794. Records of the army's stay at that time seem to indicate that the fort was in decay. Local townspeople had begun to remove logs from the stockade and its three interior buildings to be used in their own homes. The log structure that was constructed onto the powder magazine's half-timber structure is believed to have utilized logs that had originally been part of the fort.

A reconstruction of one of the five log blockhouses was built near the site in 1958 in honor of the fort's 200th anniversary. The style of the reconstruction is not necessarily the style of the original blockhouses of Fort Bedford as no contemporary images of the fort exist. Unlike the 'cube' form of most French and Indian War blockhouses, the reconstruction resembles more so blockhouses from the 1870s of the American Midwest. It is currently a museum operated by The Bedford Heritage Trust.
