= Jean Bonnet Tavern =

- Bonnet's Tavern
- U.S. National Register of Historic Places
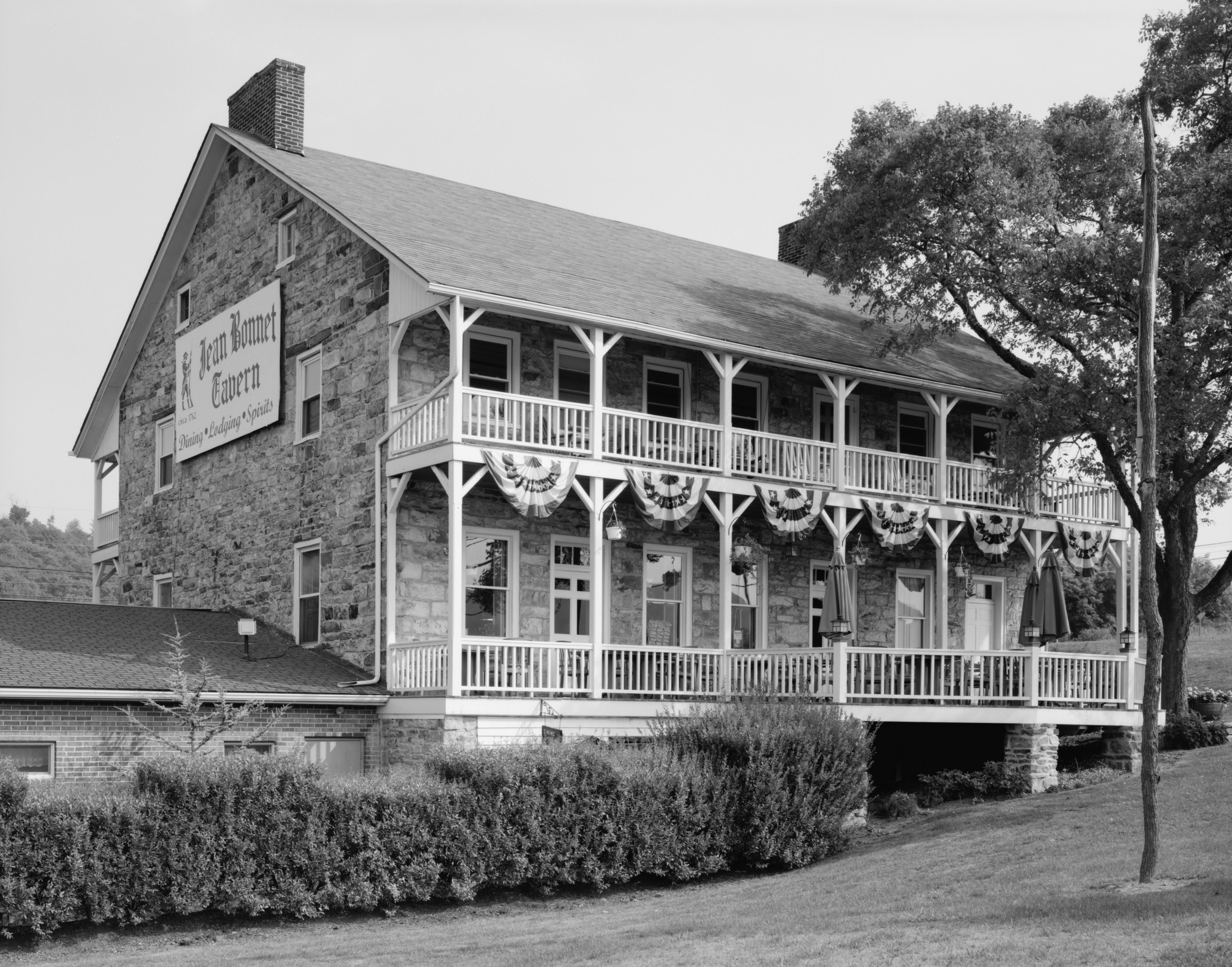
- Jean Bonnet Tavern, 2005

- Location within Pennsylvania Location within the United States
- Location: 4 miles (6.4 km) west of Bedford at the junction of U.S. Route 30 and Pennsylvania Route 31, Napier Township, Pennsylvania
- Coordinates: 40°2′32″N 78°33′39″W
- Area: less than one acre
- Built: c. 1762
- Built by: Robert Callender
- Architectural style: Colonial
- NRHP reference No.: 79002164
- Added to NRHP: August 1, 1979

The Jean Bonnet Tavern, also known as Old Forks Inn and Bonnet's Tavern, is an historic inn and restaurant that is located just outside Bedford, Pennsylvania on U.S. Highway 30, at the junction with Pennsylvania Route 31. It can be seen from the Pennsylvania Turnpike.

It was listed on the National Register of Historic Places in 1979.

== History and architectural features ==
The British first recognized the lands as being owned by Robert Callender, a trader with the Native American tribes of Pennsylvania. The land was first documented when the original 690 acre parcel was transferred from the William Penn family to a land speculator named Hans Ireland. It was again transferred to Callender in 1762 and in 1763, the large stone structure was built.

The location of the stone structure was intended to be a safe haven for settlers passing through the area as well as the site of a French fort and trading post. The tavern was referenced in the personal journals of many travelers that passed through the area on the way to what they called "Old Shawnese Cabins" which is Shawnee State Park (Pennsylvania) today.

The land and the building were purchased by Jean (John) Bonnet in 1779 and opened as an inn and tavern, which was used as a gathering place by protesting local farmers during the 1794 Whiskey Rebellion. Protesting the federal tax on whisky, local Pennsylvanian farmers gathered to raise a Liberty pole at the tavern as a symbol of their defiance. The protests were suppressed months later by forces under President George Washington.

Although the building has changed hands many times through the years, mostly maintained as a tavern and inn although in some owners converted into a private residence, the Bonnett Family of West Virginia are the direct descendants of Jean Bonnet and trace their family history back nearly 400 years. In 1957 the Jean Bonnet was purchased by the Enyeart family. During their ownership, the stores of paranormal events in the building began being publicized. Local folklore of guests and employees of the Inn reference seeing a lone figure roaming the building and drinking at the tavern bar. Said to be the ghost of Bonnet and is a popular topic of discussion and adds to the allure of the inn.

It is a 2 1/2 to 3 1/2-story building, which measures 40 feet by 51 feet. It was built using native cut fieldstone, and features two levels of porches that extend the entire length of the front and the rear elevations. The walls are more than two feet thick. There are four interior levels encompassing nearly 8,000 square feetfeaturing large, exposed chestnut beams with massive stove fireplaces.

It was listed on the National Register of Historic Places in 1979.

This structure operates today as a bed and breakfast tavern and gift shop. A small garden and goat pen are located outside of the tavern.

== See also ==
- My Ghost Story, a television series featuring the Jean Bonnet Tavern on April 30, 2011
