= Forbes Road =

Historic road in Pennsylvania, USA

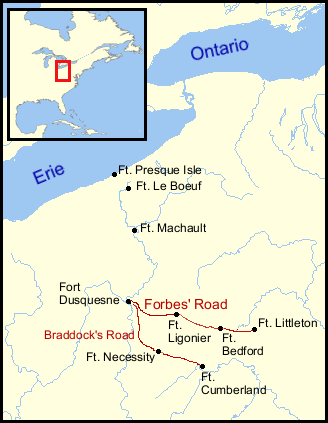
Forbes Road from Fort Lyttleton to Fort Duquesne.

The Forbes Road, a historic military roadway in what was then British America, was initially completed in 1758 from Carlisle, Pennsylvania, to the French Fort Duquesne at the junction of the Allegheny and Monongahela rivers in what is now downtown Pittsburgh, via Fort Loudon, Fort Lyttleton, Fort Bedford and Fort Ligonier. The road, initially about 220 miles long, was named for Brigadier General John Forbes, the commander of the 1758 British-led expedition that built the road during the French and Indian War (also known as the Seven Years' War). The Forbes Road and Braddock's Road were the two main land routes that the British cut west through the wilderness during the war. The task was complicated by the Appalachian Mountains' steep northeast-to-southwest ridges, a generally broken terrain between the ridges, heavy forestation, and numerous swamps and rivers.

Though the physical barriers of Braddock's and Forbes Roads seem mundane compared to later roads through the mountainous American west, they were nevertheless significant obstacles. Reginald Briggs observes of Forbes' Road, "Totaling only the more significant ascents and descents along the road, it was the equivalent of overcoming a single irregular obstacle more than 8,000 feet high, with the net result of only about 170 feet of elevation rise for the 217 miles from Carlisle to Fort Pitt."

In many respects, Forbes' Road is a misnomer. Col. James Burd did most of the initial work from Fort Loudon to Raystown (Bedford), Pennsylvania, in preparation for a major supply route southwest to connect with Braddock's Road in 1755. Col. Henry Bouquet improved upon Burd's road in 1758 and extended it to Ligonier, Pennsylvania, where he constructed the last major fortification on the road before the forks of the Ohio. From Ligonier, a rough trail was blazed through the Pennsylvania wilderness to the smoldering remnants of Fort Duquesne, with a more substantial, slightly southern route to follow later. Forbes, who suffered severe intestinal illness, directed most of the proceedings from a position well in the rear, though he was on hand to take possession of Fort Duquesne in 1758.

== History ==
=== Controversy ===
With Braddock's defeat in 1755, construction on Braddock's Road was stopped short, less than 10 miles from its goal of Fort Duquesne. To many, particularly from Virginia and the southern colonies, a continuation of Braddock's Road seemed a far more sensible solution than breaking a new path across the largely unknown Pennsylvania wilderness. There was uncertainty about whether such a northern route was even possible. Braddock's was a slightly longer path to the forks of the Ohio than Forbes' intended route but had the significant advantage of being mostly completed. In contrast, Forbes' route was little more than an uncertain footpath. A political element to the debate existed: a good deal of business and potential fortune was to fall upon the colony through which post-war traffic would flow. (Colonial boundaries in the west were still unsettled; both Virginia and Pennsylvania claimed the site of future Pittsburgh. There was, additionally, no lost love between the patrician Virginians and the Scots-Irish traders from Pennsylvania on the Ohio frontier.) In the early stages of the war, Virginia had contributed far more capital and soldiers to the war effort than had the parsimonious, Quaker-dominated Pennsylvania assembly. Southern partisans—most notably Col. George Washington—believed that their commonwealth deserved the more significant share of the proceeds.

Forbes' route passed through southern Pennsylvania, the most productive farmland in the colonies. Food, wagons, horses, and cattle were abundant—a claim sparsely-settled Maryland and northern Virginia could not make. While Braddock's Road was essentially a portage path between major watersheds—the Potomac, Youghiogheny, and Monongahela Rivers—Forbes' Road would stay to the high ground and encounter no major river crossings, thus avoiding the attendant problems of flooding, deep valleys, and exposure to ambush.

Forbes, ably assisted by Bouquet, initially seems to have intended to follow Burd's Road to "the Turkeyfoot" (Confluence, Pennsylvania), then follow Braddock's Road for the last 80 miles. There was a dawning realization that his army would be marching south for 40 miles, only to march north again in the face of potentially hardened military positions while crossing major flood-prone rivers through some very rugged territory. The direct distance from Fort Bedford to Fort Duquesne was very nearly the same as from Turkeyfoot to Fort Duquesne, but on higher ground, and offered the potential for a surprise attack on the French. And, it is quite possible that the Virginia contingent, particularly the ambitious young Col. Washington, pushed their argument beyond the patience of Forbes at a moment when the Virginia colony was contracting from its frontier defenses while Pennsylvania was advancing directly into the heart of French territory.

Several other elements were also in play: following Braddock's Road could take Forbes' troops past Fort Necessity—site of Washington's defeat—and through the killing ground of Braddock's Field, where the picked-over skeletons of the massacred colonial army still lay unburied. Such an experience could not benefit the morale of Forbes' troops. Endless and extreme rains characterized the summer and autumn of 1758, so Braddock's Road may well have been impassable had that route been followed. Forbes was also keenly aware of broader strategic concerns unfolding: British colonial advances in the north against French positions, and a potential new treaty with the Natives which would strip the French of their most significant military advantage. Both these latter ventures proved successful for the British colonials. Forbes' deliberate advance won the day; Fort Duquesne, understaffed and out of supplies, was abandoned without a fight.

=== Construction ===
Like General Edward Braddock, Forbes had the daunting task of establishing a road suitable for thousands of troops, supply wagons, and cannons across a largely unbroken wilderness. The initial footpath across south-central Pennsylvania was created by Native Americans, who likely followed game trails. European trappers and traders followed, making modest improvements and rudimentary settlements. As noted above, much of the preliminary work on the military road had been done by Col. James Burd in 1755, who built a road from Fort Loudon to Raystown (now Bedford, Pennsylvania), then southwest towards "the Turkey Foot" as a supply line to Braddock's army.

In contrast to Braddock's ill-fated expedition, Forbes proceeded with great deliberation, constructing forts and redoubts about every 40 miles, with smaller garrisons between. He also ordered the construction of smaller side-paths to parallel the main road when feasible to facilitate passing movements. Swamps were crossed with "bridges" of logs laid perpendicular to the path. Waterways were forded rather than bridged. Forbes explained in a letter to Pitt, "It was absolutely necessary, ... that I should take precautions by having posts along my route, which I have done from a project that I took from Turpin's Essay, Sur la Guerre. Last chapter 4th Book, Intitled Principe sur lequel on peut établir un projet de Campagne."

Forbes' army took possession of the abandoned (and largely destroyed) Fort Duquesne from the French army on November 25, 1758. Forbes then built a much larger fort near the site, naming it Fort Pitt and christening the nascent village of "Pittsborough."

Construction of the Forbes Road made transportation of supplies, soldiers, messages, and trade easier between the eastern farms and cities and western portions of Pennsylvania and provided an important route west for settlers for many years after. The road was critical to the success of colonials in Pontiac's War as well as the Revolutionary War. In later years, Forbes' Road provided a more direct route from Philadelphia and the northern cities to the Ohio Country through Pennsylvania in comparison to Braddock's Road, which was constructed west from Cumberland, Maryland, then north into Pennsylvania.

=== Following Forbes' Road ===
Like many wilderness roads, there were often several generally parallel tracks, a new one carved when an old one became impassable or a better route determined. Consequently, modern efforts to trace the "original" Forbes Road may be an exercise in frustration; it is often impossible to determine the original track in those rare places when any track can be discerned. Early maps of Forbes Road are of varying utility; some are flatly incorrect. One of the most interesting may be found, with much explanatory text, in "The New Way to the Forks of the Ohio: Reflections on John Potts's Map of 1758."

While the National Road (US 40) largely follows Braddock's Road across the Appalachian Mountains from Cumberland into Pittsburgh, Forbes' Road through south central Pennsylvania occasionally dissolves into a morass of speculation from Rohr's Gap (on the Allegheny Front west of Schellsburg) to Murrysville, Pennsylvania, with only a few certain locators. In the most general sense, the Pennsylvania Turnpike follows the trend of Forbes's Road west from Carlisle, Pennsylvania to near Monroeville, Pennsylvania just east of Pittsburgh, at places obliterating the historic road. A slightly more accurate rendition of Forbes's Road may be achieved by following US 30 from Chambersburg to the junction of SR 66 west of Greensburg, then north on the latter to US 22 east of Murrysville. US 22 west eventually connects with Penn Avenue, which may be followed to the sites of Fort Duquesne and Fort Pitt. Several historical markers may be found along this route.

A yet closer reconstruction of the earliest road—subject to correction—is as follows: The section of Forbes' Road initially cut by Burd in 1755 begins at Fort Loudon, at the foot of Tuscarora Mountain. This early path takes the only significant dogleg off the generally west-by-northwest road trend. Rather than directly attacking the escarpment, the Forbes' Road (SR 75) runs north up the Path Valley to Cowans Gap, climbs the alluvial fan, then continues north (CR 404) in a higher valley of the South Branch of Little Augwick Creek. Fort Lyttleton stands just west of the summit. Forbes Trail Road (CR 431) south of the fort (Off US 522) is probably accurate. The Pennsylvania Turnpike likely obliterated most of the original trail across the valley south of Hustontown and the switchbacks up Sideling Hill.

Heading west, US 30 soon parallels the turnpike, and near Breezewood, US 30 seems the most likely approximation of Forbes' road. Still heading west, the Raystown Branch of the Juniata River is crossed, and this was followed through two narrow passes (Tussey and Evitts Mountains) to Bedford, Pennsylvania.

A slight northward loop bypasses the formidable Wills Mountain. A historical marker indicates the approximate point where Burd's Road of 1755 begins its southwest course toward Confluence, Pennsylvania. The new westward track of Forbes' original route (constructed under the immediate supervision of Bouquet) seems to have also trended south before following low ground through what is now Shawnee State Park. An alternate route carved shortly after by Lt. Col. Sir John St. Clair, Forbes' quartermaster, follows the current US 30 west. Both were reportedly used during the initial march west. The park was the site of the "Shawanese Cabins" encampment Bouquet used in his 1764 expedition during Pontiac's War.

Continuing west on US 30, a turnoff past the Old Log Church parallels Forbes' Road for a short distance. The next significant obstacle is the Allegheny Front, another seemingly endless north–south ridge. In Forbes' era, there was doubt whether a break in the mountain was sufficient to permit wagon passage. After much exploration, Ensign Charles Rohr discovered a north-trending valley that, though quite steep, could be climbed by wagons. US 30 bends sharply through Rohr's Gap; Forbes' Road followed the gap to the top of the ridge where the small redoubt Fort Dewart (aka Duart), the last remaining structure from the original Forbes' Road, guards the summit.

A tentative reconstruction of the Forbes route and/or later routes suggests proceeding north from Rohr's Gap on Fleegle Road, then west on Lambert Mountain Road/Lambert Street. A slight northward bump in Central City's School Road connects with Monument Road (west). No current road follows Forbes' route over the ridge. A slight detour south on T742, west on Browning, then north on Ridge Road will connect to Old Forbes Road, which may be followed west into Kantner and Stoystown. Several branches of Forbes' Road split as the route proceeds into the rising, rougher ground of Laurel Mountain. The landscape through this region has been substantially altered by strip mining, so there is a scant likelihood of finding an original trace; US 30 west parallels Forbes' Road a few miles to the south. A roadside historical marker for Edmund's Swamp indicates where good grazing was found for horses and cattle.

US 30 (west) is probably the surest route into Jennerstown. What follows is quite speculative: North from Rt 30 in Jennerstown on SR 985 leads to Stemler and Barnick Roads, which on good evidence, seem to lie near or on the early Forbes Road. Near the intersection of Barnick with Klines Mills Roads was the Clear Fields encampment named by Bouquet. Klines Mills Road north becomes Sequenota Road, then a rough track to a reservoir. It seems likely that the earliest Forbes' Road ran up the nose of the mountain near this point, crossing the highest elevations of the entire route. Older topographic maps show a jeep trail over the ridge; its current state is unknown to this author. Over the west side of the ridge, Old Forbes picks up again near the intersection with the Laurel Ridge Trail. Several divergent "Old Forbes Roads" are to be found in this area, as there were several early iterations. The oldest seems to have trended far to the north. Workforce was needed to construct the fort at Ligonier, so this roundabout route was made to serve until a better track could be cut. The later, closer road (declared "four miles shorter and eight miles better") was developed as time permitted. As the earliest roads tended to the high ground, a lost trace of this second path across the ridge to Kissell Springs Road seems probable. Kissell Springs intersects with Nature Run Road; north on this latter connects with yet another Old Forbes Road. This trended north and west on Gravel Hill Road, then south down a lost path directly to Fort Ligonier.

West of Ligonier, US 30 parallels Loyalhanna Creek through the water gap in Chestnut Ridge—the last major obstacle on the road to Fort Duquesne. Forbes' Road unexpectedly turns south on Four Mile Run, then up and over the 700-foot hill on Youngstown Ridge Road. What occasioned this detour is uncertain. Possibly fear of ambush through the steep terrain was a concern, or the gap may have been impassable due to heavy rains, mud, and water-bourne detritus. Briggs suggests that a waterlogged gully on Youngstown Ridge may be a remnant of Forbes' Road.

North and west of Youngstown-Latrobe, much speculation again prevailed on establishing the early track. Following Youngstown Ridge Road to Arnold Palmer Drive to Clearview seems the most likely path. North on Lloyd Run (SR 981), then left on Monastery Drive to a traffic circle, then north on St. Vincent Drive seems the best approximation of the early track. Then west at Unity Cemetery Road, followed by north at McCullough Road. McCullough becomes Saxman Road, then joins Latrobe Crabtree Road north to Bovard Luxor Road. West on Bovard Luxor, then north again on Cemetery Road, west on Calvary Hill Road (CR 1032), briefly south on New Alexandria (US 119), then west on Old Forbes Road (again, CR 1032), clinging to the ridge tops for a few miles to the site of the "three redoubts" encampment of 1758. A historical marker at Old Hannastown declares the next two miles "certainly along the original Forbes Road." (To the north on Fire Station Road is the village of Forbes Road and Hannastown, probably named for later iterations of the original trace.)

Forbes Road (CR1032) continues west until the modern SR 66 interrupts its path. A quick detour south on Forbes Trail Road, then west beneath SR 66, finds Old Rt 66 (and likely the early Forbes Road) heading north until it reaches William Penn Highway (US 22). Modern development has likely obliterated any of the original trail beyond this point. Occasional sections of Old William Penn Highway may follow the early path.

As noted above, US 22 eventually meets Penn Avenue, which tracks west to Point Park and the remnants of Forts Duquesne and Pitt. Nearing the point, Penn Avenue passes near Grant Street, the site of Maj. James Grant's catastrophic attack on the French Fort.

==== After 1758 ====
A few miles to the south of Export, Pennsylvania (off PA 66) lies Bushy Run battlefield, where Col. Bouquet turned the tide on Pontiac's war in 1763.

Hulbert closes his volume with some compelling observations about the success and popularity of Forbes' Road in the years between the Revolutionary War and the coming of the railroads:

'Braddock's Road would have been exceedingly roundabout for New England travelers, as Forbes long before clearly established. Pennsylvania's new road, begun in 1785, was not a tempting route of travel for these New Englanders in this year, 1788. "The roads, at that day," wrote Dr. Hildreth, "across the mountains were the worst we can imagine—cut into deep gullies on one side by mountain rains, while the other was filled with blocks of sand stone.... As few of the emigrant wagons were provided with lock-chains for the wheels, the downward impetus was checked by a large log, or broken tree top, tied with a rope to the back of the wagon and dragged along on the ground. In other places, the road was so sideling that all the men who could be spared were required to pull at the side stays, or short ropes attached to the upper side of the wagons, to prevent their upsetting.... All this part of the country, and as far east as Carlisle, had been, about twenty-five years before, depopulated by the depredations of the Indians. Many of the present inhabitants well remembered those days of trial, and could not see these helpless women and children moving so far away into the wilderness as Ohio, without expressing their fears.... Three days after ... they reached the little village of Bedford. During this period they had crossed "Sideling Hill," forded some of the main branches of the Juniata, and threaded the narrow valleys along its borders. Every few miles long strings of pack-horses met them on the road, bearing heavy burthens of peltry and ginseng, the two main articles of export from the regions west of the mountains. Others overtook them loaded with kegs of spirits, salt, and bales of dry goods, on their way to the traders in Pittsburg.... .'

....

'... Morris Birkbeck, founder of the English settlement in Illinois, journeyed from Washington, D.C., to Pittsburg, in 1817, by way of Frederickstown and Hagerstown and the Pennsylvania Road. At "McConnell's Town," under the date of May 23, he wrote in his journal: "The road we have been travelling [from Washington, D. C.] terminates at this place, where it strikes the great turnpike from Philadelphia to Pittsburg." Of the scenes about him Mr. Birkbeck writes: "Old America seems to be breaking up, and moving westward. We are seldom out of sight, as we travel on this grand track, towards the Ohio, of family groups.... To give an idea of the internal movements of this vast hive, about 12,000 wagons passed between Baltimore and Philadelphia, in the last year, with from four to six [horses], carrying from thirty-five to forty cwt. [hundred pounds]. The cost of carriage is about seven dollars per cwt., from Philadelphia to Pittsburg, and the money paid for the conveyance of goods on this road, exceeds £300,000 sterling. Add to these the numerous stages loaded to the utmost, and the innumerable travellers, on horseback, on foot, and in light waggons, and you have before you a scene of bustle and business, extending over a space of three hundred miles, which is truly wonderful." Birkbeck does not mention the Cumberland Road, though it is drawn on the map accompanying his book. His advice to prospective immigrants is, in every instance, to come westward by the Pennsylvania [Forbes] Road.'

=== Markers ===
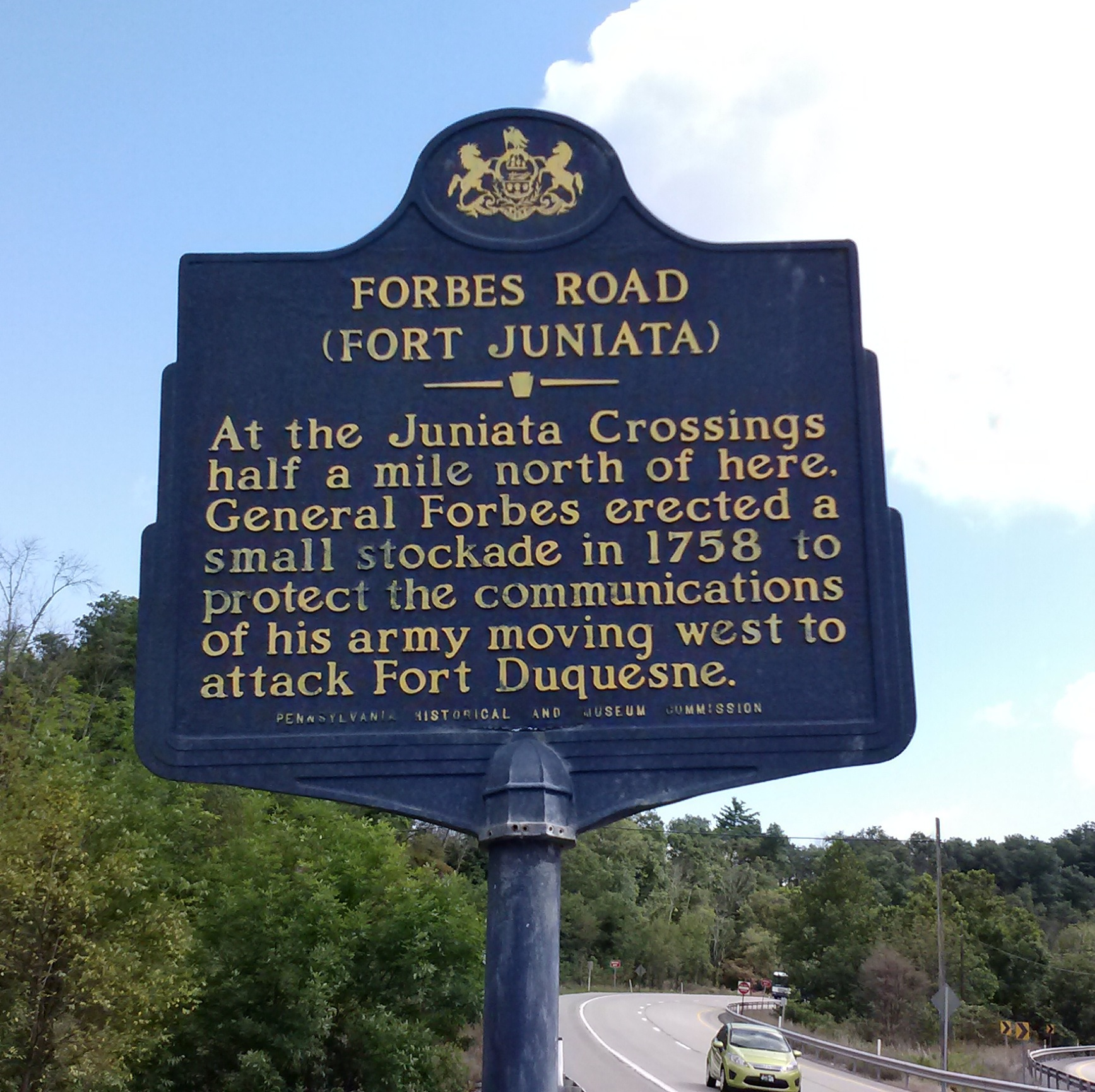
Historical marker, U.S. 30, Breezewood, PA.

Many historical markers indicate locations along the original route where Forbes traveled with his army. In Westmoreland County, a Forbes Road marker is located along US 22, 1.2 miles (1.9 km) east of Murrysville. In Cumberland County, there are markers along US 11 southwest of Carlisle and one-mile northeast of Shippensburg. In Fulton County, there is a marker along US 522, 0.2 miles (0.32 km) southwest of Burnt Cabins. Forbes Road markers have also been erected in Allegheny, Bedford, and Somerset counties.

== See also ==
- Braddock Road
- Lincoln Highway
- French and Indian War
- Great Britain in the Seven Years' War
- Battle of Fort Duquesne
