= Allegheny Uprising =

1939 film by William A. Seiter

- one-sheet poster for the film
- Directed by: William A. Seiter
- Screenplay by: P. J. Wolfson
- Based on: The First Rebel by Neil H. Swanson
- Produced by: P. J. Wolfson
- Starring: Claire Trevor; John Wayne; George Sanders; Brian Donlevy; Wilfrid Lawson; Robert Barrat; John F. Hamilton; Moroni Olsen; Eddie Quillan
- Cinematography: Nicholas Musuraca
- Edited by: George Crone
- Music by: Anthony Collins
- Production company: RKO Radio Pictures
- Distributed by: RKO Radio Pictures
- Release date: November 10, 1939
- Running time: 81 minutes
- Country: United States
- Language: English
- Budget: $696,000
- Box office: $750,000

Allegheny Uprising (released in the UK as The First Rebel) is a 1939 American Adventure Western film directed by William A. Seiter and starring Claire Trevor and John Wayne. Based on the 1937 novel The First Rebel by Neil H. Swanson, with a screenplay by the film's producer, P. J. Wolfson, the film is loosely based on the historical event known as the Black Boys Rebellion, which took place in 1765 after the conclusion of the French and Indian War. It was produced by RKO Pictures.

Clad in buckskin and a coonskin cap (as he would be a decade later in The Fighting Kentuckian), Wayne plays real-life James Smith, an American coping with British rule in colonial America. The supporting cast includes Brian Donlevy, George Sanders and Chill Wills. Claire Trevor and John Wayne also headed the cast of John Ford's Stagecoach the same year, and in both films as well as Dark Command the following year, Trevor is top-billed over Wayne due to her greater name value at the time.

The film did not fare well in its initial release. The superficially similar John Ford film Drums Along the Mohawk had been released only one week prior. In the United Kingdom, where the film kept the original title, it was initially banned by the Ministry of Information for placing the British, already at war against Nazi Germany, in a bad light.

== Plot ==
In the southwestern Pennsylvania region, of colonial America, in the 1760s, colonial distaste and disapproval of the British government is starting to surface. Many local colonists have been killed by Native Americans, who are armed with rifles supplied by white traders. Local adventurer James Smith and his followers complain to British officials, pressuring them to make it illegal to trade weapons to the Indians. Trader Callender and other businessmen are not happy with the new law, as it cuts into their profit. They continue to trade with the local Native American population, hiding rifles and rum inside military supply trains. When the British authorities fail to do anything to prevent this, James Smith organizes his men and heads out to intercept the wagon train. Smith's spirited and bold girlfriend, Janie McDougall, assists him and his men in posing as Indians to intercept the gun shipments.

Captain Swanson, a British army officer, is sent to protect the wagon train at all costs, following a complaint lodged by Callender, that Smith and his men intend to rob the wagon train, while neglecting to state that the train contains guns and liquor. Captain Swanson considers the involvement of Smith and his men as a revolt against his authority, and in retaliation, he jails more than half of the local colonists, holding them without trial. This sets Smith and Swanson on a collision course.

== Cast ==
- Claire Trevor as Janie MacDougall
- John Wayne as James Smith
- George Sanders as Capt. Swanson
- Brian Donlevy as Trader Callendar
- Wilfrid Lawson as "Mac" MacDougall
- Robert Barrat as Magistrate Duncan
- John F. Hamilton as the Professor
- Moroni Olsen as Tom Calhoon
- Eddie Quillan as Will Anderson
- Chill Wills as John M'Cammon
- Ian Wolfe as Mr. Poole
- Wallis Clark as Sgt. McGlashan
- Monte Montague as Magistrate Morris
- Olaf Hytten as General Gage
- Eddy Waller as Jailer in Carlisle
- Clay Clement as John Penn

== Context ==
Allegheny Uprising was one of only four films in which John Wayne wore a buckskin suit with a coonskin cap, the others being the 1930 widescreen epic The Big Trail (in the Grand Canyon sequence shot on location), The Fighting Kentuckian (1949) with Oliver Hardy as Wayne's sidekick, and briefly as Davy Crockett in The Alamo (1960). Allegheny Uprising and The Fighting Kentuckian are frequently confused with each other since they were filmed only a decade apart and Wayne looks much the same in both pictures.

== Reception ==
The film recorded a loss of $230,000.

== Colorization ==
The film was colorized in the late 1980s and released on VHS. New DVD copies are in black and white only.

== See also ==
- List of American films of 1939
- John Wayne filmography
