= The Black Boys rebellion =

1765 armed uprising in Pennsylvania

Black Boys Rebellion
- Part of Pontiac's War
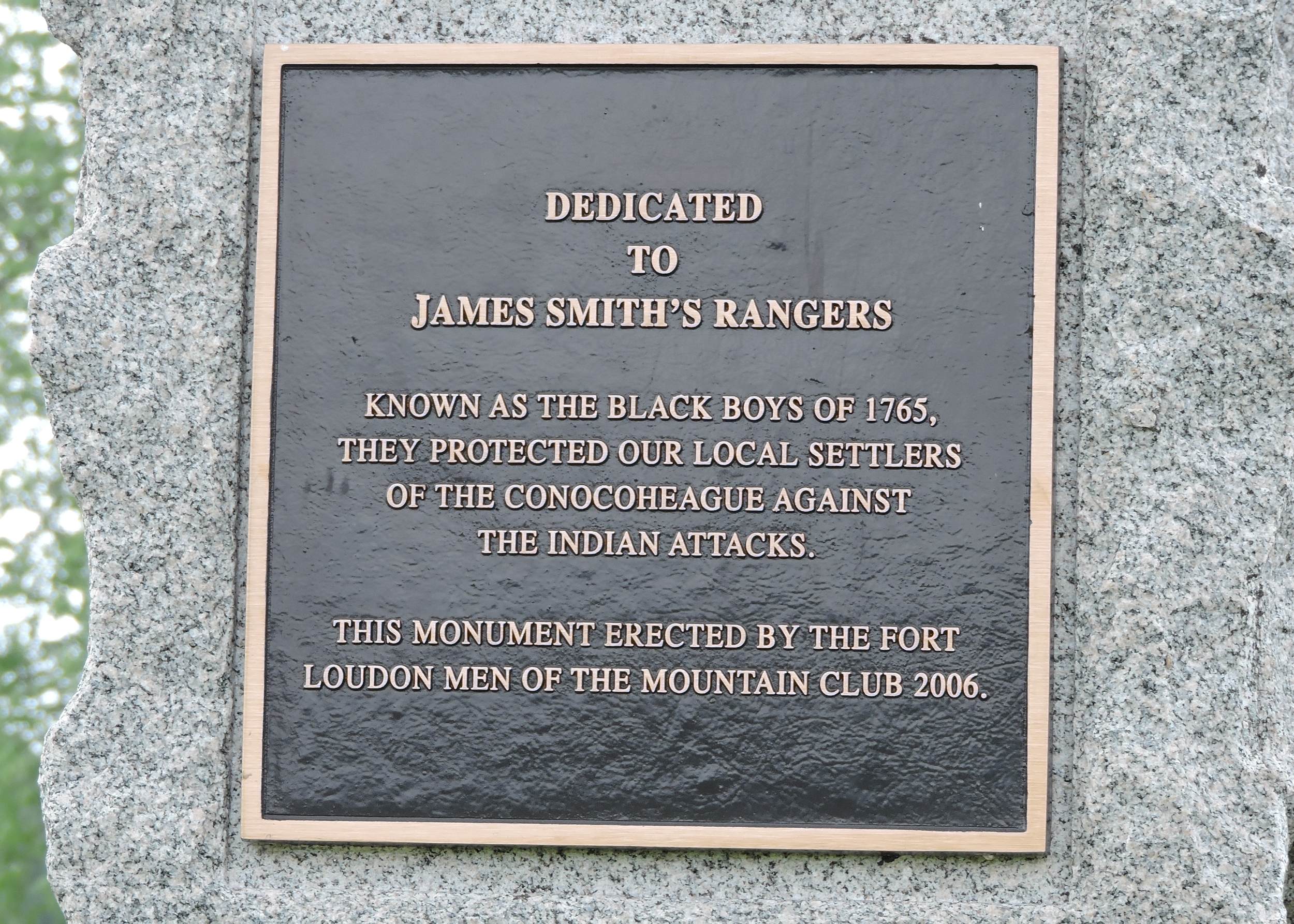
- Monument to James Smith's Rangers near the site of Fort Loudoun in Franklin County
Date	5 March - 18 November 1765 (8 months, 1 week and 6 days)
Location	Pennsylvania, Great Britain

Belligerents
(Kingdom of Great Britain) Great Britain	Black Boys

Commanders and leaders
Charles Grant	James Smith

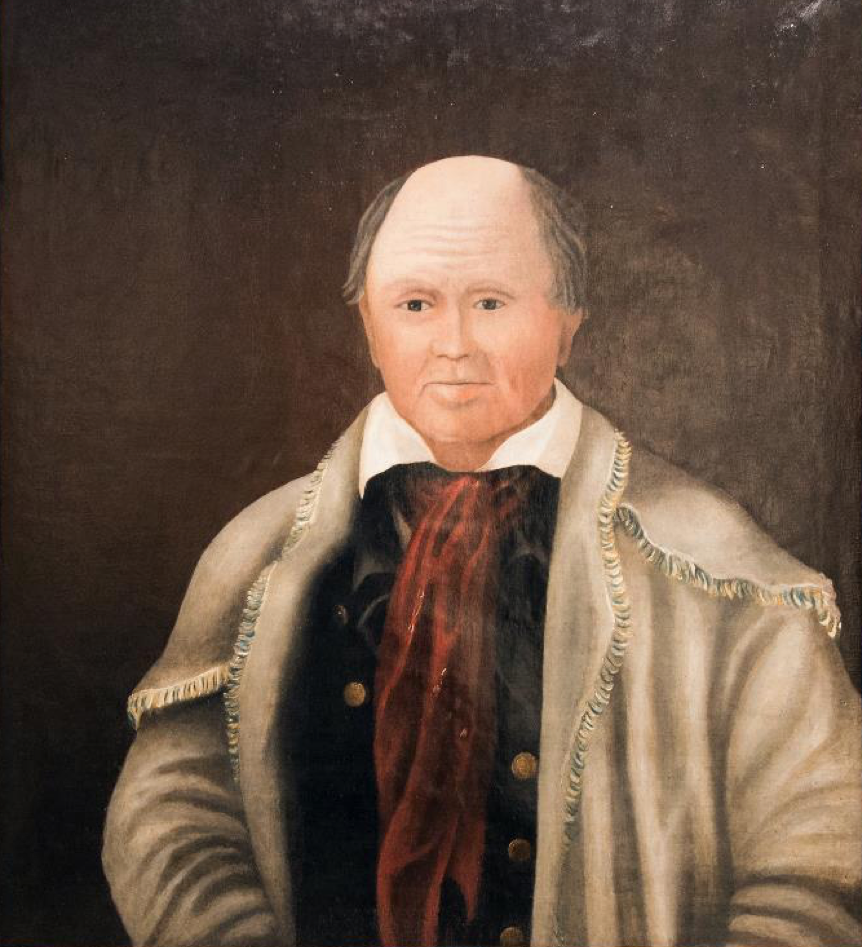
Portrait of Col. James Smith, artist unknown, c. 1800–1810

The Black Boys Rebellion, Smith's Rebellion or Allegheny Uprising, was an armed uprising in the Province of Pennsylvania between March 5 and November 18, 1765. The nine-month uprising began when a wagon train loaded with illegal "warlike goods" was discovered at Pawling's Tavern (south of Greencastle, Pennsylvania). Alarmed by the train's contents, citizens led by James Smith intercepted and destroyed the goods (valued at over $1 million in today's currency) at a mountain pass near Sideling Hill. The numerous clashes afterwards involved more destruction, firefights, arrests, a kidnapping, legal maneuvers, a court trial, a two-day siege, and one casualty.

== The Conococheague settlement ==
When the French and Indian War ended in 1763, the French surrendered the vast territory known as New France to the British. The Indigenous peoples previously aligned with the French began to see their power and influence wane. In an effort recover this influence, the Odawa war chief Pontiac united various Indigenous tribes in the Ohio Country and the Great Lakes region to prevent encroachment by European colonists. Numerous forts were captured and the conflict spread into western Pennsylvania and the Allegheny Mountains.

Centered in the valley of the Allegheny Mountains was the Conococheague Settlement, comprising land that straddled Conococheague Creek from western Maryland into south-central Pennsylvania. Settling this backcountry wilderness were Scotch-Irish and German immigrants. This land had been inexpensively offered by the Pennsylvania government, but the settlers were unaware that they served as a buffer between Indigenous territory and the more affluent settlements to the east. When Pontiac's warriors attacked frontier homesteads, killing their inhabitants, fear gripped the region much like in the early days of the French and Indian War.

When the year 1764 began, it looked as if the frontier of Pennsylvania had entered a peaceful interlude. Pontiac's forces had been defeated at the Battle of Bushy Run in August 1763. Colonel Henry Bouquet was negotiating with the Indigenous nations of the Ohio Country and it appeared that any Europeans taken captive during the French and Indian War would soon be returning to their homes. In order to prevent future conflict, Britain instituted a series of laws under the Royal Proclamation of 1763. Under these laws, Native Americans were forbidden to receive "war-like" trade items such as muskets, knives, tomahawks, gunpowder, and alcohol; and British subjects were forbidden to settle beyond the Proclamation Line, a line of demarcation that ran through the middle of present-day Pennsylvania and established the official edge of western expansion.

In June 1764, hostilities again enveloped the region. On June 26, 1764, four Lenape warriors entered a log schoolhouse near present-day Greencastle and massacred ten children and their schoolmaster, Enoch Brown. Before arriving to the schoolhouse, they had encountered a pregnant woman, Susan King Cunningham, near Fort Loudoun. She was beaten to death, scalped, and the baby was cut from her body. These events horrified the German and Scots-Irish communities.

== James Smith and the Black Boys ==
In want of protection, frontier settlers looked for men capable of defending them against Indigenous raids and raised funds to establish a company of rangers to protect the settlement. The rangers' leader was a twenty-eight-year-old Scotch-Irish immigrant by the name of James Smith. As a teenager, James Smith joined a road-cutting crew in 1755 in response to the French and Indigenous threat. He was one of James Burd’s men, responsible for hacking out a road to support General Edward Braddock's invasion of western Pennsylvania. One day, on work detail, he was captured by an Indigenous scouting party, taken to Fort Duquesne, and made to run the gauntlet. Surviving the beating, he was adopted into a Mohawk family and lived with them for five years until escaping back to the Conococheague in 1760.

As an expert on Indigenous ways, notably survival and combat, Smith was an obvious choice to lead the company in the defense of the Conococheague in 1763. Smith chose two men, also former captives, to serve as his subalterns. Roughly 35 German and Scots-Irish men volunteered and were trained in the Indigenous manner of fighting. Each man supplied their own personal weapon, either a musket or rifle. Smith had them dress "uniformly in the Indian manner, with breech-clout, leggings, moccasins and green shrouds... In place of hats we wore red handkerchiefs, painted our faces red and black, like Indian warriors." Once equipped and trained, Smith's rangers set off on trails towards the enemy. It would be ten months before they returned. During their time away the Conococheague settlement remained relatively untouched by the violence of Pontiac’s Rebellion, while homesteads as far east as Carlisle were attacked.

=== Origin of the name ===
James Smith and his men referred to themselves (in letters of the time) as the "Loyal Volunteers" or as the "Sideling Hill Volunteers". The only mention of Smith's men as "the Black Boys" appears in the August 20, 1765 deposition of Sergeant Leonard McGlashan of the British Army's 42nd (Royal Highland) Regiment of Foot who wrote: "we were fired upon warmly for some time by the Black Boys..." The name may have been coined by the Highlanders. "Black Boys" could also have referred to the town of origin (Black's Town), however, that is unlikely because the town was known as Smith's Town after William Smith, a Justice of the Peace and a relation of James, bought the town's properties from James Black in 1759. James Smith's men did paint their faces red and black and were observed with "black'd" faces in March and May 1765. The Black Boys dropped the practice when remnants of black smudge behind the ears became grounds for arrest.

== George Croghan ==
The Royal Proclamation of 1763 forbade the trading of "war-like" trade items (guns, knives, tomahawks, gunpowder, lead, rum, whiskey, etc.) to Native Americans. Furthermore, British Indian Department agents such as George Croghan were forbidden to trade goods with Native Americans for profit or to receive land from them. Croghan, his trading partners, and the Philadelphia merchants who supplied the goods disregarded these restrictions.

Anticipating a change in trade policy that would again fully open trade with Native Americans, Croghan devised a plan to establish himself west of the Proclamation Line before other traders and speculators, with the potential to gain immense wealth through land speculation. As well as serving as a British Indian Department agent, Croghan was an entrepreneur and a businessman nicknamed "Big Business" by the Native Americans. His problem was how to get around the Proclamation's prohibitions against trading warlike goods.

British officers, led by Colonel Henry Bouquet, tasked Croghan with transporting diplomatic presents to Fort Pitt. Croghan secretly approached Baynton, Wharton, & Morgan of Philadelphia sometime in late 1764 with a proposal. The firm received goods by ship from Britain, kept warehouses, and sold goods at wholesale to businessmen who in turn would sell or trade goods to consumers on the frontier, both travelling merchants and shopkeepers in Carlisle. Croghan planned to transport £20,000 to £30,000 sterling worth of trade goods including rum and gunpower to Fort Pitt. He believed that there would be little reason to fear inspection in winter. By February 1765, Croghan's shipment of goods was ready to move.

== Incident at Pawling's Tavern, March 5, 1765 ==
On March 5, 1765, the wagon train loaded with goods approached Pawling's Tavern in Greencastle, Pennsylvania. Waiting to receive them were 81 horses with pack saddles and their drivers. Due to the rough terrain, pack horses were preferred as each could carry roughly 200 pounds of goods. This eighty-one pack horse "train" was four times larger than average and carried roughly eight tons of trade goods. During the transfer of goods, one of the packages fell to the ground, causing an onlooker to see the package's contents which he believed looked like scalping knives. Word spread from Pawling's Tavern to Greencastle and the surrounding area that Croghan's pack train was carrying illegal goods. When the pack train approached Justice William Smith's House in Mercersburg, a group of 50 to 100 armed citizens confronted them. These citizens requested that the drivers store the goods at Fort Loudoun until it could be confirmed that the Native Americans had signed a peace agreement and that the governor had opened trade. The pack horse drivers refused and proceeded on to McConnell's Tavern.

== Pack train destroyed at Sideling Hill, March 6, 1765 ==
In response, concerned citizens appealed to one of their own, James Smith, to take action. Smith gathered his former rangers and set out to intercept the pack train. About 1 o’clock on March 6, Smith and his men met the pack train at Sideling Hill, west of the Great Cove. Smith ordered the drivers to turn around and be properly inspected at Fort Loudoun. The drivers refused. Smith and his men then attacked the pack train, killed and wounded several horses, and burnt most of the trade goods. The drivers fled in the direction of Fort Loudoun.

Once at the fort, the pack horse drivers pleaded with the officer in charge, Lieutenant Charles Grant of the 42nd Foot, falsely claiming that highwaymen had destroyed the King's goods rather than admitting that they were transporting illegal trade goods. After being bribed by the trader in charge, Grant sent a patrol to the site of the attack. The patrol was ordered to bring back any goods that were not destroyed, and to make prisoners of anybody that they suspected were involved in the attack. McGlashan, leading a 12-man patrol of the 42nd Foot, arrived at Sideling Hill and discovered a pile of scorched goods and seven men who quickly ran off. The patrol pursued the men and was able to capture two. They then headed to a house at Great Cove where McGlashan believed the "rioters" had rendezvoused prior to the ambush. After questioning the occupants the patrol returned to Sideling Hill to recover any undamaged goods, but the only thing found not destroyed was a quantity of rum. Armed citizens later confronted the patrol resulting in McGlashan's men taking additional prisoners and seizing a number of weapons. On March 11, 1765, James Smith and 200 to 300 armed citizens surrounded the fort and forced Lieutenant Grant to release the prisoners. Grant refused to return the weapons and so began the nine-month rebellion.

== Reaction ==
Due to the massive financial losses incurred by businessmen who had funded the trading party, and the participation of the King's troops, word spread far beyond the borders of Pennsylvania. In a letter to Sir William Johnson, Superintendent of the British Indian Department, Major General Thomas Gage, Commander-in-Chief, North America, placed the blame on Croghan for "troubling his Head more about Trade than the Business he was employed in ... taking upon himself to enter into Leagues with Traders to carry up Goods in a Clandestine Manner.".

Benjamin Franklin, publisher of the Pennsylvania Gazette, was in London when he learned of the events from an associate from Philadelphia. In referring to earlier "riots" Franklin connected the Black Boys' actions to those of Paxton Boys a year earlier and called for punitive action:

The Outrages committed by the Frontier People are really amazing! But Impunity for former Riots has emboldened them. Rising in Arms to destroy Property publick and private, and insulting the King’s Troops and Forts, is going great Lengths indeed! ... Such Practices throw a Disgrace over our whole Country, that can only be wip’d off by exemplary Punishment of the Actors, which our weak Government cannot or will not inflict. And the People I pity, for their want of Sense. Those who have inflam’d and misled them have a Deal to answer for.

Shortly after Franklin learned of the events, the news made the press in London. On May 23, 1765, the London Chronicle printed the first of seven articles concerning the riotous events on the Pennsylvania frontier. These anonymous letters detailed the inability of the Penn family to maintain order, and pressed for a stronger Royal government. Although the source of those letters remained anonymous, the style, tone, and content suggest that it was likely Benjamin Franklin.

== The Black Boys' inspection regime ==
In an effort to monitor trade, the citizens of the Conococheague declared that they would inspect any and all goods moving west in Pennsylvania. James Smith and Justice William Smith created an inspection regime to monitor trade until the matters with the Crown were resolved. Essentially Smith's men would stop travellers and search for illegal goods without having the Crown's endorsement. Once cleared, the traveller would receive a letter of safe passage signed by either Justice Smith or James Smith. Examples of these letters, such as the one below, may be found at the Pennsylvania State Archives:

By William Smith, Esq, One of His Majesty's Justices of the Peace of said County

Permit the Bearer, Thos. McCammis to pass to Fort Bedford with nine Kegs of Rum, Eight Kegs of Wine, One Keg of Spirits, One Keg of Molassas, Three Kegs of brown Sugar, Four Kegs packed with Loaf Sugar and Coffee and Chocolate. In all, Twenty Kegs and one bag of Shoes. Provided always that this Permit shall not Extend to Carry any Warlike Stores or any Article not herein mentioned.

Given under my Hand & Seal 15th May 1765

Signed Wm. SMITH

As the Sidling Hill Volunteers have already inspected these goods, and as they are all private property, it is Expected that none of these brave fellows will molest them upon the Road, as there is no Indian Supplies amongst them. Given under my Hand, May 15, 1765.

Signed Jas. SMITH

== Shootout at Widow Barr's ==
On the morning of May 5, 1765, at Cunningham's tavern near Justice Smith's home, a messenger arrived with news of illegal goods moving north of Fort Loudoun. Around twenty of Smith's men mobilized and raced to meet this pack train finding it near Rouland Harris's home. This pack train was carrying goods that were meant for the garrison of Fort Pitt (ordered and paid for by Henry Bouquet and the Crown). Arguments ensued between the two parties until violence erupted, resulting in the death of a few horses. The pack drivers fled to Fort Loudoun.

Early that evening, Lieutenant Grant discovered panicked men arriving at the fort gate claiming that highwaymen abused them and destroyed the King's goods. Grant ordered Sergeant McGlashan and twelve Highlanders to inspect the site and arrest any suspicious by-standers. McGlashan arrived at Harris's place and found the goods in a burning heap, but found no one of suspicious character. Confused as to which direction the highwaymen went, but wishing to pursue, McGlashan employed Rouland Harris to serve as scout to track down the Black Boys. McGlashan found them one mile north of the fort at one-story house referred to as "Widow Barr’s." A firefight ensured during which one of the Black Boys was taken prisoner. McGlashan released their captive when an unidentified "country man" told him "that if I did not release the aforementioned prisoner, neither me nor any of my party, would ever get back to the Fort."

As McGlashan and his men retreated back to Fort Loudoun, the Black Boys gathered themselves and headed back to Justice Smith's to regroup. Amazingly, no one was killed during the firefight, although one Black Boy by the name of James Brown was shot and wounded in the thigh. Had there been fatalities on either side, tensions likely would have escalated even further. After the firefight at the Widow Barr's home, Justice Smith and James Smith demanded to inspect the goods delivered at the fort, but were denied access by Lieutenant Grant, who assured them that they were officer's goods destined for Fort Pitt, officially ordered by Bouquet. The Black Boys also wanted Grant to return the nine firearms that he had been holding in his possession since March of that year.

Shortly after the shoot-out at Widow Barr's, the Black Boys reconvened at Justice William Smith's residence. The opportunity had arrived for Justice Smith to exercise his powers as magistrate and take legal action against the Crown by filing a warrant for the arrest of McGlashan for the wounding of James Brown. Grant, however, refused to surrender the sergeant to civil authority.

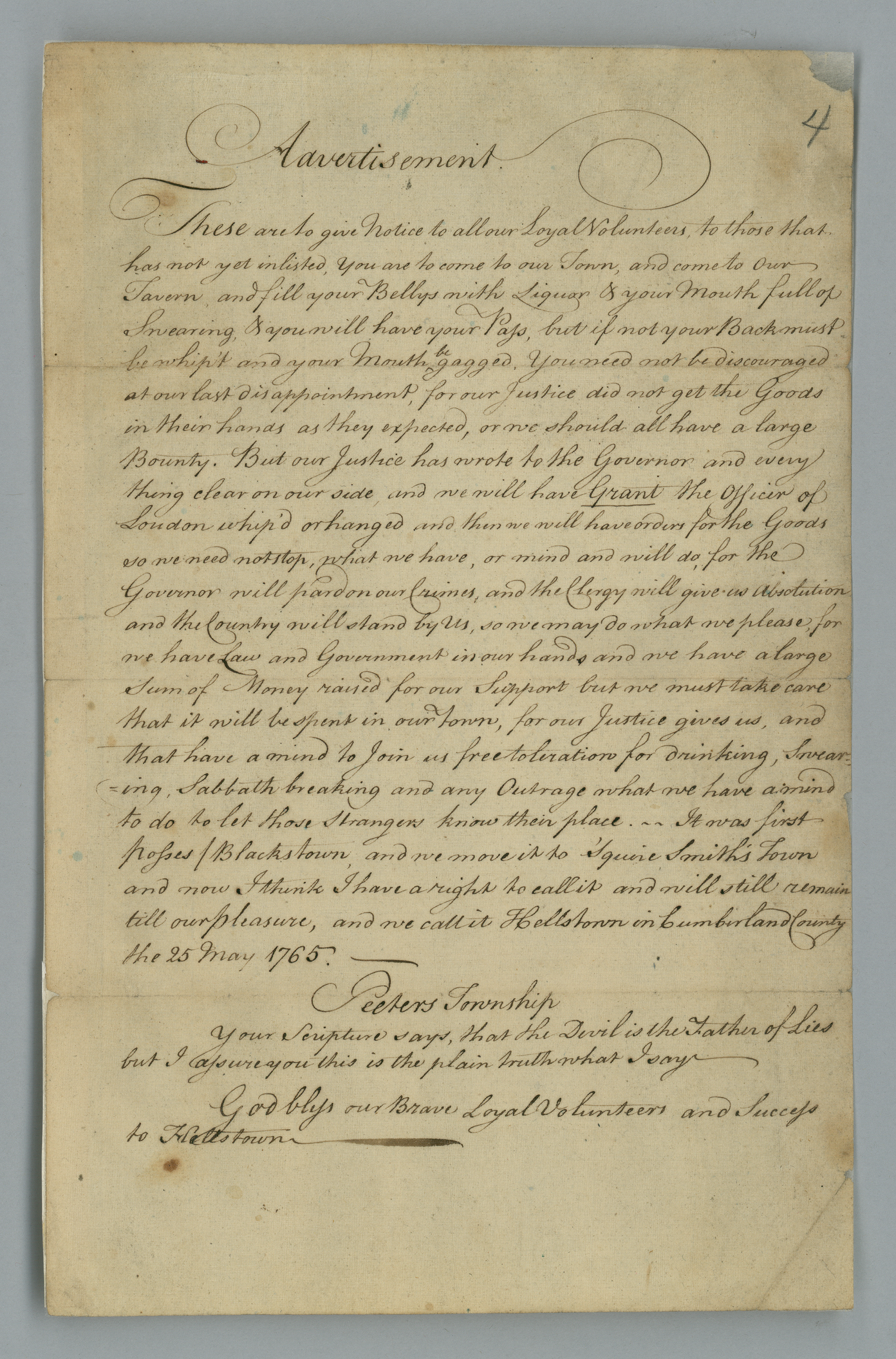
An advertisement that appeared in Cumberland County in May 1765, purportedly from the Black Boys, inviting volunteers to "come to our Tavern and fill your Bellys with Liquor & your Mouth full of Swearing."

== Kidnapping of Lieutenant Grant ==
On May 28, 1765, while out patrolling a few miles north of Fort Loudoun, a small group of Black Boys led by James Smith spotted an officer of the 42nd Foot on horseback. The Black Boys waylaid the officer and discovered that it was Grant. They held Grant captive overnight, with Smith telling him that "the Country would Rise and take the Fort by force of Arms, and by that means they would have all the goods in the Fort as well as their Own Arms." Smith added that "they were as Ready for a Rebellion as we were to oppose it, and they acknowledge that their proceedings were Contrary to law." Grant offered to return the firearms that had been confiscated. Smith brought Grant to Justice Smith where the lieutenant gave a bond for £40 if the weapons were not returned within five weeks. Despite this, Grant neither paid £40 nor returned the nine firearms taken in March even after the five-week deadline had passed.

== Aftermath ==
In June 1765, Governor John Penn announced the reopening of trade, however, the guns confiscated in early March remained an unresolved issue. In November, before Fort Loudon's garrison departed for winter quarters, Smith gathered several hundred colonists and besieged the fort. The Black Boys demanded the return of the guns and the delivery of Grant and McGlashan as prisoners. They maintained a constant fire on the fort for two nights, but eventually agreed to let the garrison depart if they returned the guns; Grant obliged through a third party. After the guns were returned the Black Boys faded as an active group.

Encroachment by colonists on Indigenous territory triggered renewed raids in 1769. A group unaffiliated with Smith but calling themselves the Black Boys ambushed a wagon train and destroyed the goods, with British regulars arresting several and imprisoning them at Fort Bedford. According to his autobiography, Smith felt obliged to free them, so he gathered some of his followers, overwhelmed the fort's garrison, and freed the prisoners. His alleged attack on Fort Bedford, however, is documented only in Smith's autobiography, but some circumstantial evidence exists, notably that when Smith was arrested in September 1769, he had taken a side road to avoid Fort Bedford. During the arrest an bystander was killed and Smith was accused of murder. He was acquitted in November after the jury was presented with evidence that showed that Smith could not have fired the fatal shot.

== The Paxton Boys ==
A year before Sideling Hill, a vigilante group called the Paxton Boys had massacred 20 peaceful Conestoga in Lancaster County, and had later marched on Philadelphia with the intent of murdering the Moravian Lenape and Mohican who had been moved there for their protection. Some historical writers have confused the two movements, or have suggested that the actions of the Paxton Boys inspired the Black Boys

Although the Black Boys were similar to the Paxton Boys in their hostility to the colonial government, they did not target Native Americans in their actions. The Paxton Boys believed the Conestoga assisted Indigenous raiders during Pontiac's War, whereas James Smith and the Black Boys suspected white traders of aiding Pennsylvania's Indigenous enemies. Both groups had their origins in frontier defence forces, both wanted the government to better provide for frontier inhabitants, and both expressed their grievances through direct action and the written word.

== American Revolution ==
The Black Boys Rebellion has been overshadowed in American historiography by events such as the 1765 Stamp Act crisis, however, the involvement of British regulars have led some historical writers to argue that the rebellion was a precursor to the American Revolution. The Black Boys Rebellion, however, was not politically motivated. The issue for James Smith and the Black Boys was not liberty or independence, but preventing the trade of illegal goods.

== Popular culture ==
A fictionalized version of the Black Boys Rebellion was depicted in the 1939 Hollywood film Allegheny Uprising, starring John Wayne as James Smith. The film was based on the 1937 historical novel The First Rebel: Being a Lost Chapter of our History and a True Narrative of America's First Uprising against English Military Authority, by Neil H. Swanson.

A song about the Black Boys Rebellion was written by George Campbell, an Irish gentleman educated in Dublin, who was a prolific songwriter in the 18th century. The song was meant to be sung to the tune of The Black Joke:

Ye patriot souls who love to sing,
What serves your country and your king,
In wealth, peace, any royal estates,
Attention give whilst I rehearse,
A modern fact, in jingling verse,
How party interest strove what it cou’d,
To profit itself by public blood,
But, justly met its merited fate.
Let all those Indian traders claim,
Their just reward, inglorious fame,
For vile base and treacherous ends.
To Pollins, in the spring they sent,
Much warlike stores, with an intent
To carry them to our barbarous foes,
Expecting that no-body dare oppose,
A present to their Indian friends.
Astonish’d at the wild design,
Frontier inhabitants combin’d
With brave souls, to stop their career,
Although some men apostatiz’d,
The bold frontiers they bravely stood,
To act for their King and their country’s good,
In joint league, and strangers to fear.
On March the fifth, in sixty-five,
Their Indian presents did arrive,
In long pomp and cavalcade,
Near Sidelong Hill, where in disguise,
Some patriots did their train surprise,
And quick as lightning tumbled their loads,
And kindled them bonfires in the woods,
And mostly burnt their whole brigade.
At Loudon, when they heard the news,
They scarcely knew which way to choose,
For blind rage and discontent;
At length some soldiers they sent out,
With guides for to conduct the route,
And seized some men that were trav’ling there,
And hurried them into Loudon where
They laid them fast with one consent.
But men of resolution thought,
Too much to see their neighbors caught,
For no crime but false surmise;
Forthwith they join’d a warlike band,
And march’d to Loudon out of hand,
And kept the jailors pris’ners there,
Until our friends enlarged were,
Without fraud or any disguise.
Let mankind censure or commend,
This rash performance in the end,
Then both sides will find their account.
‘Tis true no law can justify,
To burn our neighbors property,
But when this property is design’d
To serve the enemies of mankind,
It’s high treason in the amount.
