= James Smith (frontiersman) =

Frontiersman, farmer and soldier in British North America

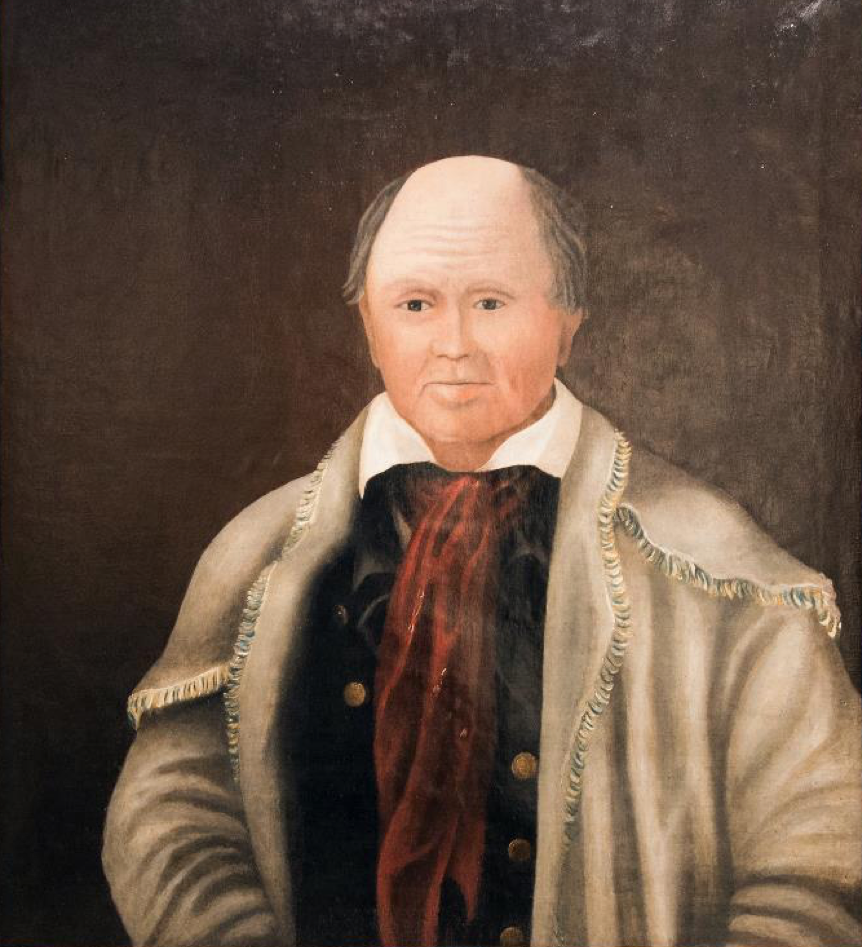
- Portrait from 1800-1810 by an unknown artist
- Born: November 26, 1737; Lancaster County, Pennsylvania, present-day Franklin County, Pennsylvania
- Died: April 11, 1813 (aged 75); Green County, Kentucky
- Occupations: Frontiersman, militia officer, politician, author, missionary
- Known for: Leader of the Black Boys
- Spouse: Anne Wilson

James Smith (November 26, 1737 – April 11, 1813) was a frontiersman, farmer and soldier in British North America. In 1765, he led the "Black Boys", a group of Pennsylvania men, in a nine-month rebellion against British rule ten years before the outbreak of the American Revolutionary War. He participated in the Revolutionary War as a colonel of the Pennsylvania militia and was a legislator in the Kentucky General Assembly. Smith was also an author, publishing a memoir about his captivity by Native Americans in his Narrative in 1799, and in 1812 an in-depth analysis of Native American fighting techniques, based on observations during his captivity.

== Early life ==
Smith was born in Lancaster County, Pennsylvania, in an area now part of Franklin County, Pennsylvania. Some later sources suggest that he had little formal education. Though he lived in an area that was very Scottish, he himself was of English descent. Smith was born and raised in Pennsylvania but his parents were from the Chesapeake region of Virginia. He is not related to the politician of the same name.

== French and Indian War and aftermath ==
In May 1755, he worked on the Braddock Road, a road built west from Alexandria, Virginia in support of General Edward Braddock's ill-fated expedition against the French. He was captured by Delaware Indians and brought to Fort Duquesne at the Forks of the Ohio River, where he was forced to run a gauntlet before being given over to the French. He was adopted by a Mohawk family, ritually cleansed, and made to practice tribal ways – ultimately gaining respect for Native American culture. He escaped near Montreal, but was jailed by the French for four months until his release in a prisoner exchange with the British. He returned to the Conococheague Valley in Pennsylvania and took up farming, marrying Anne Wilson in May 1763.

During Pontiac's War, he fought in the 1763 Battle of Bushy Run and accompanied the 1764 British expedition led by Henry Bouquet into the Ohio Country. When the unrest subsided, however, the British allowed trading with the Native Americans to resume, angering the colonists.

== Black Boys Rebellion ==
In the 1760s, Smith took part in an unofficial band called Black Boys, so-called because they resided in Black's Town (then named after resident James Black, present-day Mercersburg, Pennsylvania) and disguised themselves in Native American dress, were upset with British policy regarding Native Americans following Pontiac's War. On March 6, 1765, they stopped a pack train and burned goods, including rum and gunpowder, that Irish-born official George Croghan sought to trade to Native Americans, out of hatred for the Native Americans.

British authorities, however, supported Croghan's trading, and this led to the Black Boys Rebellion. The rebels laid siege to Fort Loudoun in the Pennsylvania mountain country and captured enough soldiers to exchange them two-for-one for settlers imprisoned, rightly or wrongly, for raids on wagon trains. The rebellion subsided in November.

In June 1766, Smith left to explore Kentucky. During the trip, he was injured by puncturing his foot on rivercane. With the help of an enslaved man named Jamie, Smith managed to return east to North Carolina. He was jailed because of his rough appearance until someone was found who could vouch for him.

In 1769, Smith and the Black Boys surprised Fort Bedford, freeing some prisoners being held there.

Later in 1769, while passing through Bedford with two companions, Smith was accosted by several men intent upon his arrest for being the leader of the Black Boys. Shots were fired, and one of Smith's companions was accidentally killed. Smith was initially found guilty of murder and jailed for four months before being exonerated and released. During his jail time, a group of 300 people, some of them Black Boys, came to free Smith from the jail, but Smith convinced them to return home in peace.

== American Revolutionary War ==
Smith represented Westmoreland County, Pennsylvania at the 1776 Constitutional Convention.

When the American Revolutionary War broke out, he joined the Pennsylvania militia as captain, and was made a colonel in 1778. Smith described his orders for at least one action against Indians: "In case of an attack, the officers were immediately to order the men to face out and take trees – in this position the Indians could not avail themselves by surrounding us, or have an opportunity of shooting a man from either side of the tree."

After his wife died in 1778, Smith moved to Westmoreland County. In 1785, he married Margaret Irvin. By the late 1780s, he and his family were living in Bourbon County, Kentucky. He served as a member of the Kentucky General Assembly for a number of years.

In 1799, he published his narrative, An Account of the Remarkable Occurrences in the Life and Travels of Col. James Smith, consisting of an autobiography and an analysis of Indian culture.

== Missionary work ==
Smith became a Presbyterian missionary to the Native Americans, aided by the knowledge he had acquired of their customs in his early captivity. His son became a Shaker, but he himself, after living with his son among the Shakers for a few months, concluded they were a cult and denounced them in a pamphlet entitled Remarkable Occurrences Lately Discovered Among The People Called Shakers, printed in 1810. He continued his attack in another pamphlet, "Shakerism Detected", also printed in 1810.

In 1812, in response to the nation's continuing troubles with the Indians, Smith published "A Treatise on the Mode and Manner of Indian War".

== Death ==
According to the May 8, 1813, edition of the Kentucky newspaper The Reporter, "DIED, at the house of Mr. John Rodgers, Green County, on Sunday, the 11th of April, Colonel JAMES SMITH, late of Bourbon County ... after an illness of four weeks" from an unspecified disease.

== Book, film, and television ==
James Smith was the subject of the 1937 book The First Rebel by Neil H. Swanson. He was portrayed by John Wayne in the 1939 movie Allegheny Uprising, which was based on the book. A segment in the 2006 PBS miniseries The War that Made America shows a dramatization of Smith running the Native American gauntlet, following his capture in 1755.
