= Thomas Barton (divine) =

Reverend Thomas Barton
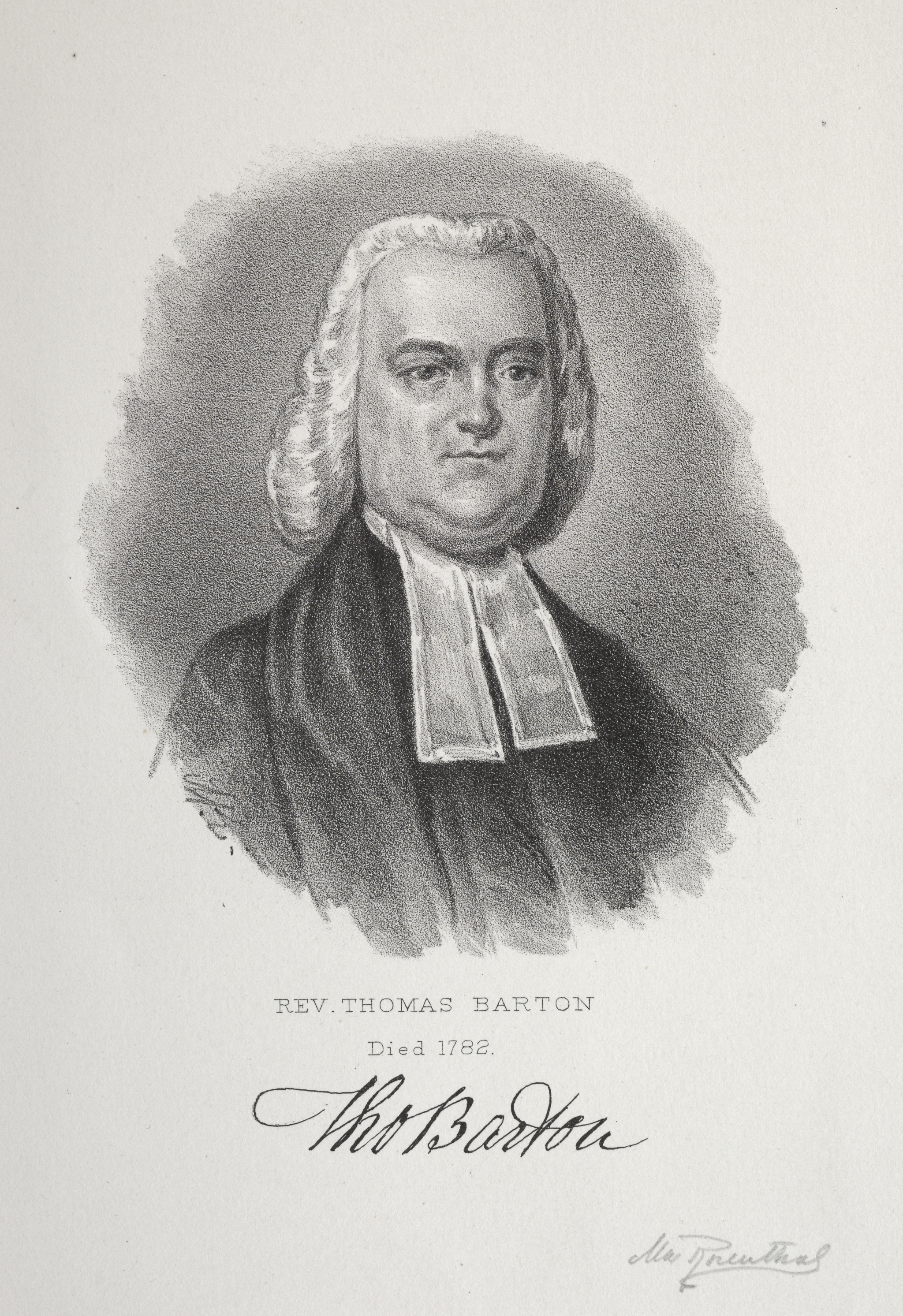
- Rev. Thomas Barton. His correct death date is 1780.
- Born: 1728; County Monaghan, Ireland
- Died: May 25 1780; New York
- Burial place: Buried in St. George's Chapel, New York but moved when it was demolished. His remains moved to Trinity Cemetery, New York (exact location unknown)
- Monuments: Memorial stone St. James Churchyard, Lancaster, PA
- Education: Trinity College, Dublin
- Occupation: Clergyman
- Predecessor: George Craig
- Successor: Joseph Hutchins
- Spouse(s): Esther Rittenhouse (married 1753-1774) and Sarah De Normandie (married 1776)
- Children: 9

Thomas Barton (1728– 25 May 1780) was an Anglo-Irish Anglican clergyman who served as a missionary in Pennsylvania and was an ardent supporter of British colonial rule.

== Life ==
Coat of Arms of Thomas Barton

Barton was a native of Ireland, but descended from an English family that settled there in the reign of Charles I. He was born in County Monaghan, Ireland (at that time the Kingdom of Ireland) in 1730. After graduating from Trinity College Dublin he emigrated to America, and in 1751 opened a school at Norristown, Pennsylvania, around the age of 21. He was for some time tutor at the academy (now university) at Philadelphia. In 1753, Barton married Esther Rittenhouse, the daughter of a neighbouring farmer, and sister of David Rittenhouse, the distinguished mathematician and astronomer, whose close friendship he enjoyed until his death.

In 1754, Barton went to England, where he received episcopal orders. He returned to America as a missionary of the Society for the Propagation of the Gospel, with which he remained connected until 1759. He accompanied, as chaplain, the expedition to Fort du Quesne (now Pittsburgh), which ended in the defeat and death of its leader, General Braddock. On leaving York County, Pennsylvania, he settled at Lancaster as rector of St. James's. Here he remained nearly twenty years, dividing his time between the duties of his office and the pursuit of natural history. He was elected to the revived American Philosophical Society in 1768. At last his adherence to the royalist party compelled him to quit his post, for he was unwilling to take the oath of allegiance after the Declaration of Independence. He removed to New York, where he died, 25 May 1780, aged 50. His wife died before him on 18 June 1774. Benjamin Smith Barton, the American physician and naturalist, was one of his children.
