= Jacques Le Tort =

French-Canadian fur trader in 17th century Pennsylvania

- Born: c. 1651; Bonnétable, Maine (province), France
- Died: July 1, 1702 (aged 51) at sea (presumed)
- Occupations: Explorer, fur trader
- Years active: 1686-1702
- Known for: First explorer to travel up the Missouri River (1688); Collaboration with James Logan
- Spouse: Anne Le Tort (c. 1655 - c. 1720)
- Relatives: Sons: James Le Tort (c. 1675 - c. 1742), Francis (c. 1686 - c. 1711); Daughter: Ann Margaret

Jacques Le Tort (c. 1651 – c. 1702) was a French-Canadian fur trapper, trader, explorer and entrepreneur who spent much of his life in the Province of Pennsylvania engaged in the fur trade. He collaborated with other French-Canadians living there at the time, including Peter Bisaillon and Martin Chartier, as well as the future mayor of Philadelphia, James Logan. By the late 1690s he had become wealthy and somewhat notorious; the Provincial authorities had his wife arrested on suspicion of conspiring with the French to take control of Pennsylvania territory, although no charges were ever proven. He disappeared following a trip to England in 1702 and is presumed to have died at sea. His wife Anne Le Tort and his son James Le Tort took over his business after his death.

== Birth and immigration to America ==
Le Tort was born in Bonnétable (dept. of Sarthe). He became a Huguenot refugee who arrived in New France in 1686. A letter of recommendation dated 1 January 1686 gives his age as 35, so it is inferred that he was born in 1651. The letter also refers to him as "Sieur" ("Lordship"), a title generally used for landowners of elevated social status. Several Pennsylvania documents refer to him as "Captain Le Tort," although the reasons for this are unclear. His wife Anne, his young son James, and two uncles came from France with him, spending a few months in London before embarking for Quebec. A second son, Francis was born soon after their arrival. One source also lists a daughter, Ann Margaret, born before 1715.

== Early career ==
Le Tort was hired by Daniel Coxe and Matthias Vincent, who attempted to establish a colony of French Huguenots in East and West Vincent Township, Pennsylvania and who planned to create an empire in the Indian trade on the south shore of Lake Erie. In 1696 Provincial Governor William Markham wrote that "Le Tort is a Protestant, who was sent over in the year 1686 with a considerable cargo and several French Protestants, of whom he had the charge, by Doctor Cox, Sir Mathias Vincent...to settle 30,000 acres of land up the Schuylkill, that they had bought of Mr. Penn." The colony failed because Huguenot families did not want to move from Philadelphia to wild lands along the Schuylkill and Susquehanna Rivers, although Le Tort and his wife Anne built a homestead there, leasing 400 acres from Coxe and establishing a trading post on the Schuylkill, near the present site of Spring City, Pennsylvania. Coxe founded the New Mediterranean Sea Company in hopes of expanding his business, but could not secure authorization from William Penn, as the British were concerned that competition would reduce fur prices and affect their profits. In 1687 Coxe sent a large quantity of trade goods from England to stock Le Tort's trading post, writing to his agent in Philadelphia:

Sir, I had ordred a Cargoe of Sortable Commodities...which Cargoe Cost here in England att best hand above six hundred pounds...I desire you would lett Monsieur Le Tort and those on my Plantation know that...I have sent all necessaries both for themselves & Indian Trafick and I have ordred my Agent to intrust Mr Le Tort with goods to a considerable vallue...Mr Le Tort hath desired mee to intrust him wth some goods & hath faithfully promised returne of furrs to a good vallue in ye Spring.

Anxious to establish relations with Native American tribes further west, Coxe encouraged Le Tort and his neighbors to make contact with communities in the Ohio Valley and along the upper Mississippi.

== Journey west ==
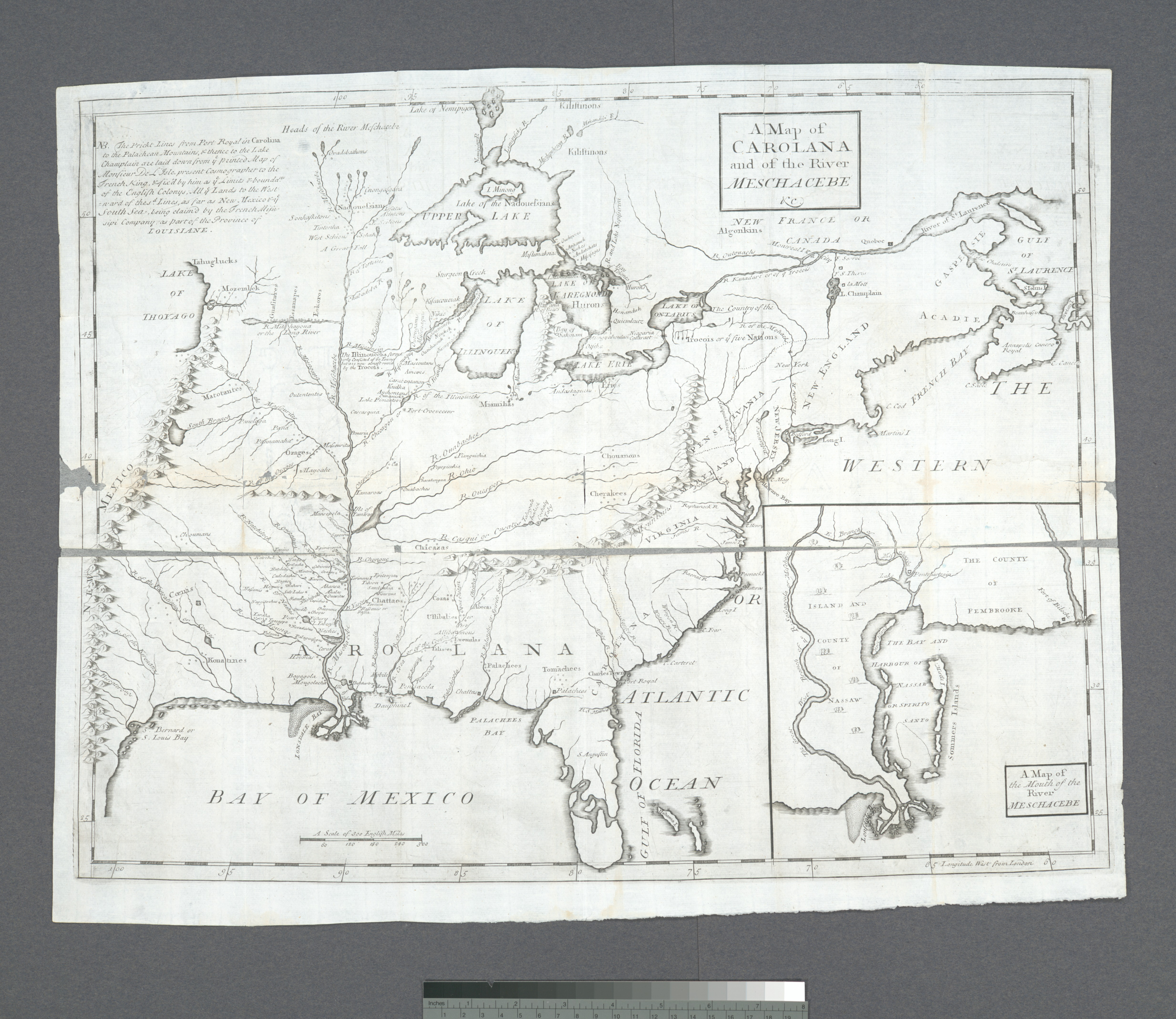
1722 map of Carolana probably based partly on a map drawn by Jacques Le Tort during his 1687-88 journey up the Meschacebe (Mississippi) River.

In 1687 or 1688 Le Tort and two other men, probably Huguenots, made their way by canoe up the Susquehanna River, portaged to the Allegheny River, descended the Ohio River to the Mississippi and ascended the "great yellow river," probably the Missouri River. Little is known of the journey as the venture was kept secret to prevent interference by the government of New France or by rival businesses, and Le Tort's journal and map were eventually lost. Coxe later wrote:

I Encourag'd severall to attempt further discoveries whereupon three of my Tenants in a birchen Canoa went up School Kill (a River comes into Delaware River at Philadelphia) above one hundred Miles then a Branch of the same River to its head, & Carrying their Canoa over some small Hills entred the Great River Hohio, which after a great Course of Six hundred Miles Joynes the Mischacebe [Mississippi], and going up that River went up the great yellow River three days Voyage, which River Comes from ye Hills which separate New Mexico from Carolana. They went & Returned Through above forty Nations of Indians who all treated them very kindly & gave them many furs for Indian Trade they Carried with them. I had from them a Large Journall written & a Large Mapp, very Exact, abating the want of Latitudes which [they] had not skill nor Instruments to Take.

Coxe published a report which he submitted in 1719 to the Lords of Trade, but which does not describe the events of the journey or name the three explorers. Le Tort's journal and the map were loaned to William Penn and disappeared. One of Le Tort's two companions on this journey may have been his fellow countryman Peter Bisaillon, who had traveled down the Mississippi in 1686 with Henri de Tonti. In 1688 Le Tort hired Bisaillon to assist him at his trading post in Pennsylvania.

== Journey to Europe, 1690 ==
King William's War erupted in 1688 over competition between England and France for trade routes and territory, which affected Le Tort's business by interfering with travel and reducing access to Native American hunters who supplied fur. In 1690, Le Tort decided to make a dangerous journey to England to meet with Coxe to discuss opening new areas of business. He left his trading business in the capable hands of his wife, Anne Le Tort. The journey was a difficult one, as described by Provincial Governor William Markham to Governor Francis Nicholson of Maryland in a letter of 26 June 1696:

This Letort was going for England in the ship with Governor Hamilton but he was taken [by the French]. Letort was carried to Tholoun and narrowly escaped the galleys but after a long and hard usage got into England, where he became acquainted with the West Jersey Company and they understanding that his house stood upon the Schuylkill upon a convenient place for trade with the Indians, contracted with him to trade for them there and wrote to their agent to supply him with goods.

Le Tort evidently did not arrive in England until after 4 March 1692, when Coxe had sold all of his land holdings in North America, and had sold his business interests to the London Company. Le Tort was able to negotiate a contract with the West Jersey Society of London, and returned to Pennsylvania, probably in early 1694, with new business opportunities.

== Trial of Anne Le Tort ==
Pennsylvania authorities including William Penn suspected that Le Tort and other coureurs des bois such as Peter Bisaillon were spying for the French, that they were "very dangerous persons" who "kept private correspondence with the Canida Indians and the French," who "entertained strange Indians in remote and obscure places," and who "uttered suspicious words." They were harassed, arrested and imprisoned, often on false or minor charges.

During Le Tort's absence, his wife was summoned to Philadelphia (together with Peter Bisaillon, and another Huguenot named Captain John Dubrois) and accused on 19 December 1693 before the Provincial Council of Pennsylvania of having carried on a secret correspondence in the year before with "the strange Indians called the Shall-Narooners (Shawnees) and the French of Canada." Anne Le Tort was given until February 6 to respond before the council, during which time her husband Jacques returned from England and appeared with her in Philadelphia. The accusation, by Thomas Jenner and Polycarpus Rose, stated that Anne Le Tort had predicted that the French would come "to take away land from the English," that she had frequent visits from "strange Indians whose language they could not understand," and that she had left a mysterious packet wrapped up in a blue linen cloth, which was then picked up by "James the Frenchman." They also stated that on one occasion she had assaulted Polycarpus Rose with a horsewhip. Le Tort countered the accusations, denying that she had uttered any statement about the French, admitting that she had visits from "strange Indians" as she was operating a fur trading business, identifying the packet as her account book showing the debts owed to her by the Indians, and justifying the attack on the grounds that Rose and Jenner were stealing business from her by trading liquor to the Indians for furs. The Council resolved that Captain Le Tort should give sureties "that hee shall acquaint the governmt with all matters hee can hear of or observe concerning the Natives & the enemies of the countrie, and that he take the oaths appointed by act of parliamt..." He and his wife were then released.

== Rivalry with other fur traders ==
In 1694 Le Tort established a partnership with Martin Chartier, another French-Canadian who had arrived in Pennsylvania with a band of Shawnee Indians, including his wife Sewatha Straight Tail (1660–1759) and his son Peter Chartier (1690—c.1759). Martin Chartier was an old friend of Peter Bisaillon and had lived with the Shawnee since 1685. By the late 1690s the Canadian fur trade network had become so well-developed that there was a glut of furs coming into Quebec, leading to a drop in prices. For a few years Bisaillon, Chartier and Le Tort ran a smuggling operation, bringing furs from Detroit to Albany and Pennsylvania, where the English paid a higher price for them. A map titled "A Draught of the Susquehanna River in 1701, made by Isaac Taylor, Surveyor of Chester County" locates "J. Le Tort's store" at the site of the borough of Northumberland, Pennsylvania.

Using their connections with Native American communities, Le Tort, Bisaillon and Chartier posed a threat to other local fur traders, and soon there were complaints. In 1702 Robert Quary, Surveyor General of the Customs for New Jersey and Pennsylvania, informed the Provincial Council that "the French are settling themselves on the back of Pennsylvania, about four days journey from New Castle, and...offered this Article to show the danger of the Country for want of a due provision for their defence."

== Second journey to Europe and death ==
On 4 May 1696 Casperus Augustine Herman, son of Augustine Herman and Lord of Bohemia Manor, wrote to the Maryland Provincial Council that "Peter Basilion does now live at St. John's, in Chester County, Pennsylvania, but formerly lived thirty miles backwards from any inhabitants, where he treated with the Indians, and was then reported that...Capt. Le Tort, a Frenchman, does now live back in the woods in the same place where the said Basilion formerly lived, and trades with the Indians." This indicates that Bisaillon decided to move out of the backcountry, closer to a town such as Downingtown, while his colleague Jacques Le Tort took over the direct trade with the Native Americans who supplied most of their furs.

On June 26, 1696 Governor Markham wrote to Governor Francis Nicholson of Maryland that "It is not many days since that [Le Tort] went to Burlington to make up his account with the agent [of the West Jersey Company], intending to soon as conveniently can for England." Le Tort was planning to accompany another shipment of furs to London for sale. One source reports that on this journey Le Tort's ship was captured by pirates and he may have been killed but a letter from Le Tort dated 4 March 1702 appears among William Penn's correspondence and indicates that Le Tort was in London at that time, and had gone to Penn's home there in hopes of meeting with him. A second letter dated 4 May 1702, is signed by Jacques Le Tort. He addresses a controversy over Penn's commerce with "French Indians" in Pennsylvania, opening his letter with:

I thought it my duty to write to you, since no one is better qualified than I, after 16 or 17 years since the persecution in France forced me to your Province, especially as regards the affairs of the Indians, amongst whom I have lived and traded all that time.

Jacques Le Tort is known to have testified at a hearing, on behalf of William Penn, in London on 9 June 1702, in regard to accusations that Peter Bisaillon was a French spy. No further record of Jacques Le Tort exists, and it is presumed that he died at sea on his return to America.

== Family ==
Le Tort's elder son James Le Tort spent the years 1692 to 1697 in service to a Canadian sea captain and returned to Pennsylvania to take part in his father's fur trading business. He too was arrested and imprisoned several times between 1704 and 1711, but eventually became a prosperous trader. In about 1720, he established a trading post at Le Tort's Spring, close to what is now Carlisle, Pennsylvania, and another on the Allegheny River.

Le Tort's younger son Francis Le Tort was apprenticed or indentured to the Swedish-American trader, John Hansson Steelman (1655–1749) (also referred to as Stelman or Tillmann), and in 1711 stole (or tried to free) several slaves (probably other white bond-servants) and fled into the forest. Steelman offered bounty to some Shawnee warriors to bring him back dead or alive, and Francis was killed.

James Logan maintained a good friendship with Anne Le Tort until the end of her life, and in 1719 he asked Isaac Taylor to survey land as a gift for her, on the Susquehanna River near Conewago Creek, with an additional plot of land for her son James Le Tort. Logan's letter to Taylor says, in part:

Loving ffriend. Thou wilt receive from Peter Bizaillon himself the warrants on orders for surveying a thousand acres of land...in executing of which I doubt it will be difficult to reconcile his and Anne Le Tort's expectations, but I request thee to use thy endeavours...I am very desirous the old gentlewoman should have some land that she may be fixed, and leave something to her grandchildren. Pray see that it be laid out of a sufficient depth; I think a mile and a half or a quarter, at least, is little enough, but this is left to thee...J. Le Tort is to have 500 acres laid out in the same manner. Thy real friend, J. LOGAN.

Anne Le Tort died before 19 November 1720 when papers of Administration were filed in Chester County. Her son James was named administrator of her estate. He lived until at least July, 1742 when Lieutenant Governor George Thomas received a letter from him about the murder of two white settlers.
