= Letort =

Letort or Le Tort may refer to:

== People ==
- Désiré Letort (1943–2012), French cyclist
- Léon Letort (1889–1913), pioneer French aviator
- Jacques Le Tort (c. 1651 – c. 1702), French-Canadian fur trapper, trader, explorer and entrepreneur
  - James Le Tort or Letort (c. 1675 – c. 1742), his son, Pennsylvania fur trader and coureur des bois
- Louis-Michel Letort de Lorville (1773–1815), a French general of the Napoleonic Wars

== Other uses ==
- LeTort Spring Run, a watercourse in Pennsylvania, U.S.
- LeTort Elementary School, in Carlisle Area School District, Pennsylvania, U.S.
- Anne Letort Elementary School, in Penn Manor School District, Pennsylvania, U.S.

== See also ==
- Émile-Louis Letord (1880–1971), sometimes spelled Letort, French industrialist and pioneer aeroplane manufacturer
