= James Le Tort =

French-born fur trader in 18th century Pennsylvania

- Born: c. 1675; Bonnétable, dept. of Sarthe, France
- Died: after 1 July 1742; Allegheny, Pennsylvania (presumed)
- Occupations: Explorer, fur trader
- Years active: 1703-1742
- Known for: Fur trader who established trading posts in remote Native American communities in Pennsylvania and Ohio; Collaboration with James Logan; Prominent Delaware language and Shawnee language interpreter at councils and conferences
- Parent(s): Jacques Le Tort (1651-1702); Anne Le Tort (c. 1655 - c. 1720)
- Relatives: Brother: Francis Le Tort (d. 1711); Sister: Ann Margaret Le Tort; Son: James Le Tort

James Le Tort (often spelled James Letort, c. 1675 – c. 1742) was a Pennsylvania fur trader and a coureur des bois active in the early 18th century. He established trading posts at several remote Native American communities in Pennsylvania and Ohio and became fluent in the Delaware and Shawnee languages. During the 1720s he frequently served as an interpreter at councils and conferences between Native American leaders and the government of the Province of Pennsylvania.

== Early life ==
He was the son of Jacques Le Tort and his wife Anne, and was born in France, probably in Bonnétable (dept. of Sarthe). Le Tort arrived in Quebec with his parents, who were Huguenot refugees, in 1686, and settled in eastern Pennsylvania. His younger brother Francis and his younger sister Ann Margaret were born after their parents' arrival. His father was hired to establish a colony of French Huguenots in East and West Vincent Township, Pennsylvania, but the colony failed and Jacques Le Tort eventually became a fur trader in partnership with Martin Chartier and Peter Bisaillon. His first trading post was on the Schuylkill River. Around 1700 they moved and established a new trading post on the Susquehanna River.

On 28 May 1692, at about age 17, James Le Tort bound himself to a five years' term of service to John King, a Canadian sea-captain. He spent the years 1692 to 1697 in service and returned to Pennsylvania to take part in his father's fur trading business at the family trading post in Northumberland, Pennsylvania. His father accompanied a shipment of skins and furs to London and on his return voyage in June 1702, was lost at sea. James then went to work for his father's partner, Peter Bisaillon. They traveled together to Canada from 1701 until 1703.

== Arrests and imprisonment ==
Pennsylvania authorities including William Penn suspected that Le Tort and other coureurs des bois such as Peter Bisaillon were spying for the French, that they were "very dangerous persons" who "kept private correspondence with the Canida Indians and the French," who "entertained strange Indians in remote and obscure places," and who "uttered suspicious words." They were harassed, arrested and imprisoned, often on false or minor charges. In June 1703, records show that

"James Le Tort, who about two years ago went out of this Province to Canada, and returned last spring, having been upon his return examined before several of ye Council and magistrates, and no great occasion found to suspect him of any evil designs against the Government, he having been bred in it from his infancy, had hitherto behaved himself inoffensively, and was seduced to depart in time of peace by the instigation of some others, without any evil intentions that could be made appear in himself; and being now in town, together with Peter Bezalion, another Frenchman and Indian Trader, it was judged necessary to call them both before Council, and for further satisfaction, to take security of them for their behavior towards the Government. Accordingly, they were sent for, and obliged each to give security in five hundred pounds sterling."

A short time after these bonds were executed in October 1704, Le Tort was locked up as a prisoner in the Philadelphia common jail. He submitted a petition to the Provincial Council, stating that "he had alwayes been faithful & bore true allegiance to ye Crown of England & was ready to give such further Security as should be thought reasonable, Yet was abriged of his Liberty and detained a prisoner, and praying for relief therein." After paying an additional security of a thousand pounds, he was released and continued trading with the Indians, his mother assisting him. He was again imprisoned in August 1711, because of his French descent, and required to pay another security.

== Death of Francis Le Tort, 1711 ==
Le Tort's younger brother Francis Le Tort (often erroneously referred to as "Francis de la Tore") was apprenticed or indentured to the Swedish-American trader, John Hansson Steelman (1655–1749) (also referred to as Stelman or Tillmann). In 1711 he stole or tried to free several slaves (probably other white bond-servants) and fled into the forest. Steelman offered bounty to some Shawnee warriors to bring him back dead or alive, and Francis was killed.

== Career as a fur trader ==
In February 1707, Le Tort, along with Martin Chartier, Peter Bisaillon, and two other Frenchmen accompanied the Swiss explorer Franz Ludwig Michel to the upper branches of the Potomac at Antietam and Conococheague creeks, in what is now Franklin County, Pennsylvania, where Michel believed they would find silver ore. Intending to set up a mine, they built several cabins and asked the Conestoga Indians living nearby for assistance, promising that the Provincial Government of Pennsylvania would pay them for their service. The Indians were suspicious, and sent a messenger to Philadelphia to find out if in fact this was true. The Provincial government ordered the Frenchmen to appear in Philadelphia to explain their actions. Franz Ludwig Michel disappeared without offering an explanation, and no silver ore was ever found.

Governor John Evans found Le Tort trading with the Shawnees when he visited Paxtang, Pennsylvania on 1 July 1707. At that time, many white fur traders and other merchants were trying to influence Native American communities to side with either the French or the British, one of them being the trader Nicole Godin, an Englishman born of a French father in London. After 1701 Godin operated a trading post near Paxtang and became well known for "using endeavors to incense these people [the local Shawnees], to stir them up to enmity against the subjects of the Crown; and to join with our public enemy, the French, to our destruction." Governor Evans persuaded Martin Chartier and James Le Tort to lure Godin into a trap, and Godin was arrested. Godin was tried for treason in Philadelphia in 1708, but the results of the trial are unknown.

Le Tort was formally licensed to trade with the Indians in January, 1713 and his name is listed on the first tax-list of Conestoga Township after it was founded in 1718. By 1720, after the death of his mother, Le Tort established a trading post at Le Tort's Spring, near what later became the site of Carlisle, Pennsylvania. He built another trading post on the Allegheny River.

In his petition in 1722 to the Chester County Court, he asked for the renewal of his trading license on the grounds that he had then been "a Trader amongst the Indians for the past twenty-five years." In a letter dated 23 February 1724 James Logan mentions that "James Letort...has been in the branches of the Mississippi for these two winters past and trading far up Susquehanna." Between 1725 and 1727 Le Tort had a store at the forks of the Susquehanna, on the north side, where he carried on a trade with the Shawnees of Chillisquaque Creek, as well as with the Mingoes and Delawares living at Shamokin; with the Munsees under Manawkyhickon at Muncy Creek; and with the Shawnee on the West Branch of the Susquehanna and on Great Island. John Taylor's 1727 map of the forks of the Susquehanna River shows James Le Tort's store to the east of Shamokin.

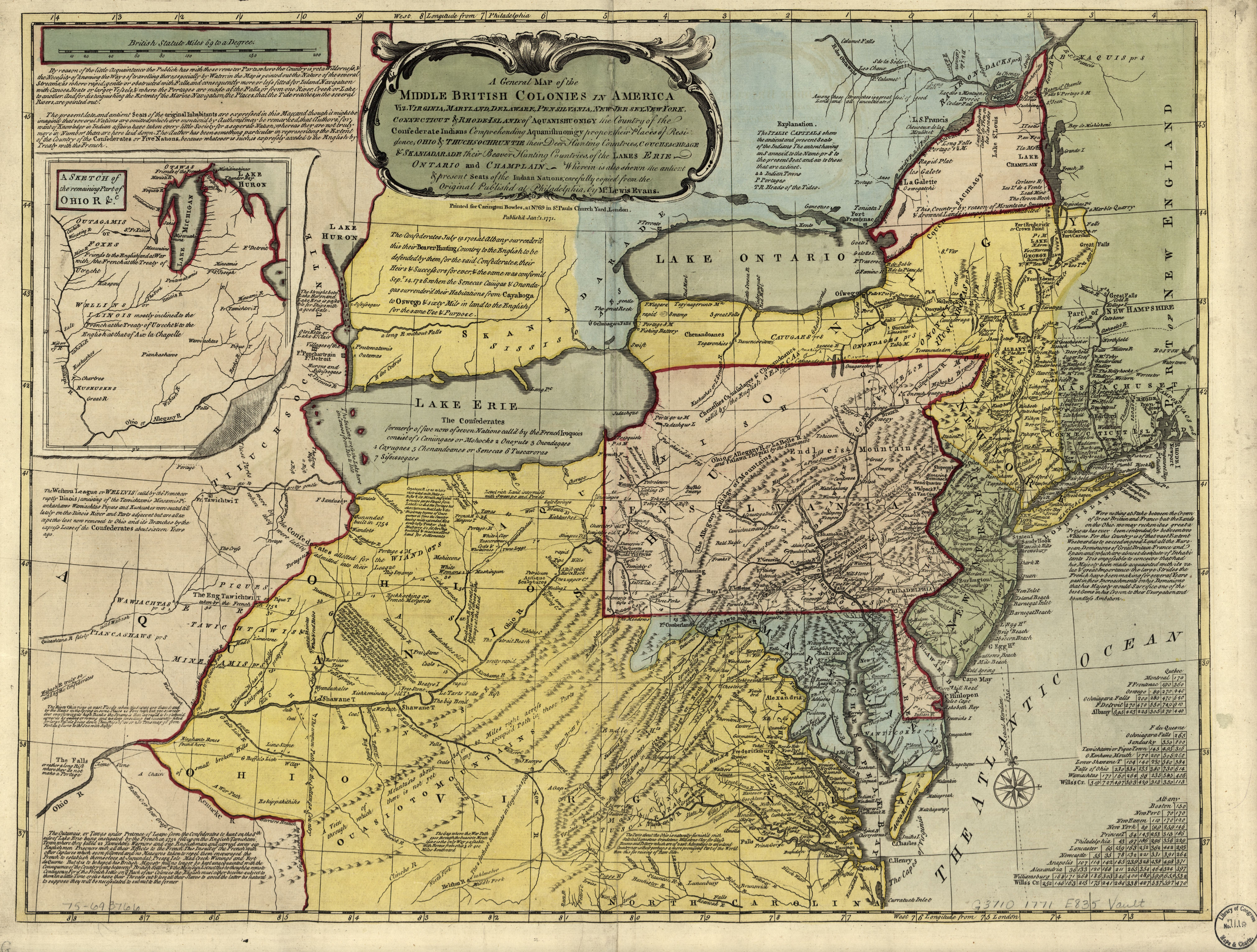
1771 map of the British colonies in America showing "Letarts Falls" on the Ohio River in the lower left quadrant.

After 1727, Le Tort operated a trading post at Le Tort's Spring, together with the other "Shamokin Traders," John Petty, Henry Smith, Samuel Cozzens, John Hart, John Fisher, Timothy Higgins, Jonah Davenport, John Scull and his brother Nicholas Scull II, and Anthony Sadowski. He was one of the earliest, if not the first of the Shamokin Traders to follow the Delawares westward of the Alleghanies. A community near Shelocta was known as of 1769 as "James Letort's Town." This was probably the site of his trading post "at Allegheny" after 1729. Le Tort's Town, Le Tort's Falls and Le Tort's Island in the Ohio River along the southern border of Meigs County, Ohio (all now corrupted to "Letart's"), date from the period when he traded with the Shawnees and Delawares there. He may have settled in the Ohio country for several years, but more probably continued making trips between Philadelphia and Allegheny up to an advanced age.

On 1 May 1734, five Shawnee chiefs dictated a letter to the Governor and Council of Pennsylvania, regarding the various traders who came among the Indians at Allegheny, listing those who were operating in Shawnee communities without a license, and naming others who had engaged in assault and "raising false reports," asking that these traders "may be kept particularly from us." Le Tort and several other traders, including Peter Chartier, were permitted to "have license to come and trade with us." Limits were placed on the amount of rum each trader could sell, and a demand was made that all traders bring "good powder." The letter was signed by Neucheconeh and four other Shawnee leaders and witnessed by Le Tort, Chartier, Larey Lowrey and Jonas Davenport.

Le Tort's name appears as a witness to a deed of release signed by the Delaware chiefs at Philadelphia, 25 August 1737.

== Land gift from James Logan, 1719 ==
In 1719 James Logan asked Isaac Taylor to survey land as a gift for James' mother Anne Le Tort, on the Susquehanna River near Conewago Creek, with an additional plot of land for her son James. Logan's letter to Taylor says, in part:

"Loving ffriend...I am very desirous the old gentlewoman should have some land that she may be fixed, and leave something to her grandchildren. Pray see that it be laid out of a sufficient depth; I think a mile and a half or a quarter, at least, is little enough, but this is left to thee...J. Le Tort is to have 500 acres laid out in the same manner. Thy real friend, J. LOGAN.

In 1720, Le Tort established a trading post on what is now known as LeTort Spring Run, in the area of present-day Carlisle, Pennsylvania.

== Career as interpreter ==
Because of his fluency in Unami, the Delaware dialect, Le Tort was officially employed as interpreter at several conferences. He eventually learned some of the Algonquian languages such as Shawnee well enough to interpret them also. The first reference to his acting as interpreter appears in the Minutes of the General Assembly for 9 May 1704, in which he was asked to interpret for two Iroquois who had brought a message from the Five Nations.

In 1707, the Assembly requested that he be dismissed as untrustworthy due to his French heritage: "The House of Assembly requested the Governor that he would not employ any longer James Letort and Nicholas [Godin] as Indian Interpreters, as they ought to be considered very dangerous persons."

He is listed as an official interpreter at the Conestoga Council of July 1721, and the Conestoga Council of June 1722, both attended by Governor William Keith. Following a conference at Shamokin in May 1722, Le Tort was named as interpreter to relay the response of the Lenape chiefs Sassoonan, Opekasset, and Manawkyhiokon to the Pennsylvania Council. In September, 1722 he was one of several interpreters at the Albany conference of 1722 at which the Albany Treaty of 1722 was signed and ratified by the Mohicans, Oneida, Cayuga, Onondaga, and Seneca.

On 30 April 1730, Le Tort acted as interpreter and scribe for a letter from Shannopin and five other Lenape leaders, "the chiefs of ye Delewares at Allegaeniny, on the main road," to Deputy Governor Patrick Gordon, protesting against the sale of rum in Lenape communities and asking the Governor to "prevent any further misfortunes for the future, we would request that the Governor would please regulate the Traders, and suppress such numbers of them from coming into the woods; and especially from bringing such large quantities of rum." The letter was to explain the death of two traders named John Hart and John Fisher, who were accidentally shot during a hunting expedition with a group of Lenapes in the fall of 1729. Another trader, David Robeson, was shot and beaten during an altercation. These incidents were blamed on intoxication by rum of those involved.

In June 1732, Le Tort's name appears as "interpreter" on a letter from several Shawnee leaders sent to Governor Gordon in explanation for the sudden move of Shawnees from Pechoquealin (now Smithfield Township, Monroe County, Pennsylvania) to Wyomink in August, 1728. The move was so sudden that the Shawnees did not take the time to harvest their cornfields. The letter states that the Five Nations proposed that the Shawnees join them in attacking English settlements, but the Shawnee refused, and the Five Nations advised them to relocate to Wyomink, adding that the Shawnee should "look back toward Ohio, the place from whence you came; and return thitherward." Le Tort had by that time acquired fluency in the Shawnee language after many years of trading in Shawnee communities.

== Role in preventing conflict, 1728 ==
In April, 1728 Le Tort reported to Governor Patrick Gordon that Manawkyhickon, a Munsee Delaware chief who lived at Muncy Creek, and with whom he had consulted about making a trading trip to the Miamis, had discouraged him by saying that "he might happen on his way to see some Indians who come to hunt for scalps."

Le Tort discussed the matter with Madame Montour, who had promised to accompany him to the Miami country, but now informed him that she could not do so because she had heard

"that a Delaware Indian woman whose son had been killed by the Shawanese had brought Manawkyhickon a long belt of black wampum of twelve rows, desiring that by means thereof her tears might be wiped away; that Manawkyhickon had sent this black belt to the Five Nations; and that the Five Nations sent the same to the Miamis, with a message, desiring to know if they would lift up their axes and join with them against the Christians; to which they agreed; that thereupon, Manawkyhickon had sent four belts of wampum to those of his nation who were abroad hunting, ordering them quickly to return home."

Le Tort then questioned Manawkyhickon, who admitted that it was true, that Manawkyhickon was related to Wequela, an Indian who was hanged in 1727 in New Jersey, and that Manawkyhickon was still angry. At a meeting of the Pennsylvania Provincial Council held 1 September 1728, it was observed that Manawkyhickon, in resentment for the death of Wequela, had been trying to turn the Twechtwese (Miamis), against the Pennsylvania colonists, and possibly also the Five Nations.

The Governor immediately sent Le Tort and John Scull with messages and presents, and he instructed them to deliver the same to Allumapees, to Madame Montour, and to Manawkyhickon. Reassuring answers came in response to the Governor's messages and on 15 May, Anthony Sadowski and John and Nicholas Scull were sent with additional presents for Allumapees, Opekasset, and Manawkyhickon. Again there were favorable responses, but in August Sadowski sent a message to John Petty (another Shamokin Trader), who was in Philadelphia, that an Indian had brought news that "at Shamokin, the Sauanos [Shawnees] had hanged Timothy Higgins upon a pole of their cabin," although he did not say why. Petty wrote back that, while on their way to Shamokin, they had met Higgins, who "was thought to be hanged, escapt his life very narrowly...We dare not take him [back to Shamokin]."

Governor Gordon then informed the Pennsylvania Council that "some little differences had accidentally arisen between the Traders and the Shawanese," and that he was making every effort to calm the frightened colonists and soothe the Delawares and Shawnees in order to keep tensions from rising. Le Tort and the other Indian traders who had frequent contact with Native American communities were instrumental in carrying messages and gifts, clearing up misunderstandings, and in keeping all sides informed of events.

== Deposition of 1731 ==
Le Tort and his colleague Jonas Davenport were called to testify before Governor Patrick Gordon on 29 October 1731. Le Tort and Davenport had by then traveled to Native American communities across western Pennsylvania and knew them well. This information was especially valuable to the Pennsylvania government in terms of expanding its control over the fur trade, in competition with the French, who were attempting to maintain control of the Ohio Country by sending emissaries to meet with Native American leaders. In his examination, Le Tort states that he

"is lately come from Allegeny, where there are several settlements of Delaware, Shawanese, Asswikalus, and Mingoe Indians, to the number of four or five hundred; that for these three years past, a certain French gentleman, who goes by the name of Cavalier, has made it his practice to come every spring amongst the Indians settled there, and deals with them but for a very small value; that he particularly fixed his abode amongst the Shawanese, with whom he holds frequent Councils; and, 'tis generally believed, with a design to draw them off from the English interest."

Le Tort also speaks of visits made to Montreal by the Shawanese in the early part of the years 1730 and 1731.

At the time of their examination, Davenport and Le Tort provided an estimate of the populations of the Allegheny settlements, and the names of their chiefs, as follows:

- Connumach: 20 families; 60 men; Delawares.
- Kythenning River, 50 miles distant: 50 families; 150 men; mostly Delawares. Chiefs: Capt. Hill, a Alymaepy; Kykenhammo, a Delaware; Sypous, a Mingoe.
- Senangelstown (sometimes identified as Shannopin's Town), 16 miles distant: 16 families; 50 men; Delawares. Chief: Senangel.
- Lequeepees, 60 miles distant: Mingoes, mostly, and some Delawares; 4 settled families, but a great resort of these people.
- On Connumach Creek, three Shawanese Towns; 45 families; 200 men. Chief: Okowela (suspected to be a favourer of the French interest).
- Asswikales: 50 families; lately from S. Carolina to Ptowmack, 100 men. Aqueloma, their chief, true to the English.
- Ohesson upon Choniata, distant from Susquehanna, 60 miles: Shawanese; 20 families; 60 men. Chief: Kissikahquelas.
- Assunepachla upon Choniata, distant, about 100 miles by water and 50 by land from Ohesson: Delawares; 12 families; 36 men.

== Family ==
One source reports that he was living with his wife Ann at his settlement at Le Tort's Spring in 1720, when Shawnee Indians set fire to his cabins because of a disagreement. Le Tort rebuilt his trading post and continued his business.

A James Letort, possibly his son, is listed as serving under George Washington at the Battle of Great Meadows on 9 July 1754, He is listed as a member of Captain Peter Hog's company, and again under "Men Fit for Duty, Sick or Wounded," as "Lame on the road."

== Death ==
He lived until at least July, 1742 when Lieutenant Governor George Thomas received a letter from "Le Tort, the Indian trader at Allegheny," informing him that some "Taway (Ottawa) Indians had passed through the Shawnee settlement there, having with them the scalps of two white persons whom they had slain." He disappears from the records after this, and 1742 is usually listed as his date of death and burial.

== See also ==
- Jacques Le Tort
- Shamokin (village)
- Coureurs de Bois
- Fur trade
- Peter Bisaillon
