= Peter Chartier =

Fur trader, tribal chief and temperance activist

- Born: Pierre Chartier, Shawnee: Wacanackshina (White One Who Reclines) c. 1690; Tennessee
- Died: 1759 (aged 69); Old Shawneetown, Illinois
- Known for: Promoting Native American civil rights, early Temperance movement
- Spouse: Blanceneige-Wapakonee Opessa (1695–1737)
- Children: François, René and Anna Chartier
- Parent(s): Martin Chartier (1655–1718); Sewatha Straight Tail (1660–1759)

Peter Chartier (c. 1690—c.1759) (Anglicized version of Pierre Chartier, sometimes written Chartiere, Chartiers, Shartee or Shortive) was a fur trader of mixed Shawnee and French parentage. Known in Shawnee as Wacanackshina, he later became a leader and a band chief among the Pekowi Shawnee. As an early advocate for Native American civil rights, he joined other chiefs in opposing the sale and trade of alcohol in indigenous communities in the Province of Pennsylvania. He first tried to limit the sale of rum in Shawnee communities but also expanded that effort to other indigenous peoples.

Because of conflict with the English provincial government, in 1745 he accepted a French commission and left Pennsylvania with his band. Beginning with more than 400 Pekowi Shawnee, he migrated over the next four years through parts of modern Ohio, Kentucky, Alabama and Tennessee. He and his people eventually resettled in the Illinois Country of New France, near a French colonial community. He and some of his warriors later fought on the side of the French against the English during the French and Indian War.

Chartier is memorialized in numerous place names, including communities (Chartiers Township and Chartiers (Pittsburgh)), rivers (including Chartiers Creek and Chartiers Run (Allegheny River tributary)) and school districts such as the Chartiers Houston and Chartiers Valley School Districts.

== Early life and family ==
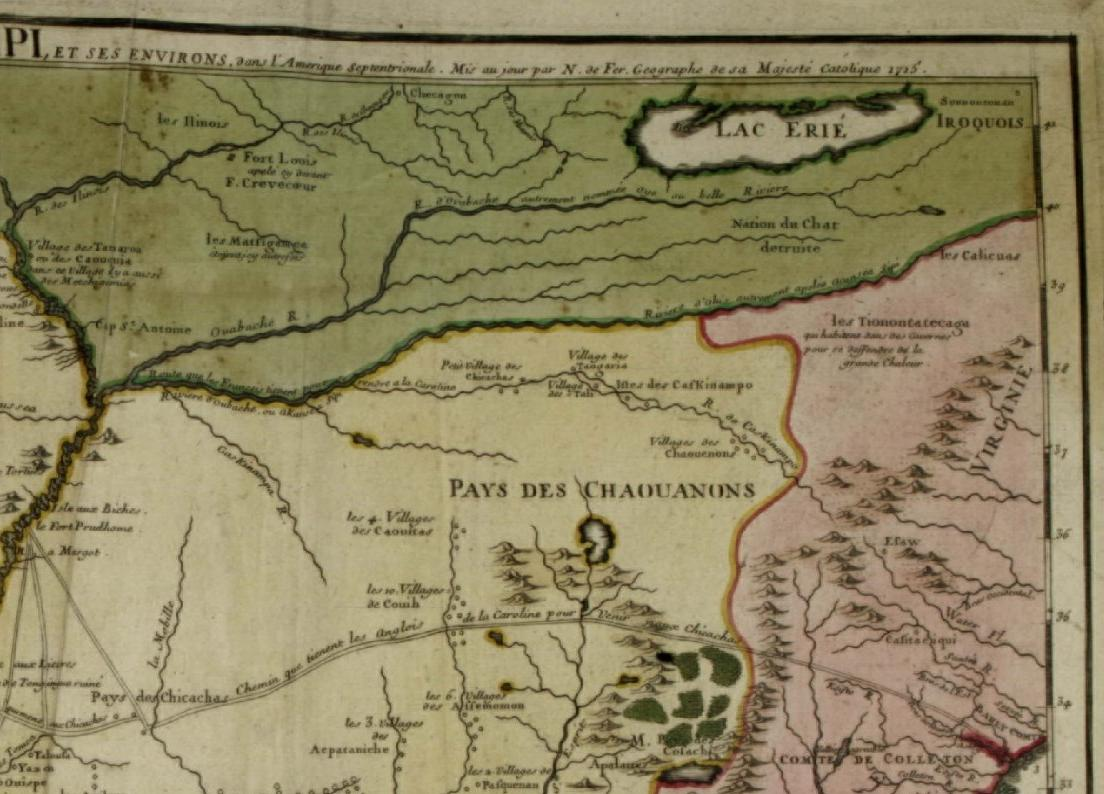
1715 map showing the land of the "Chaouanons" (Shawnee)

He was born Pierre Chartier, the son of a French colonist Martin Chartier (1655–1718). Martin Chartier and Sewatha Straight Tail (1660–1759), a daughter of Straight Tail Meaurroway Opessa and his wife, of the Pekowi Shawnee.

Pierre Chartier was born in 1690 at French Lick on the Cumberland River in Middle Tennessee, near the present-day site of Nashville, Tennessee, where his father ran a trading post.

His mother gave Pierre the Shawnee name of Wacanackshina, meaning "White one who reclines". Around 1697 his family moved to Pequea Creek in Lancaster County, Pennsylvania.

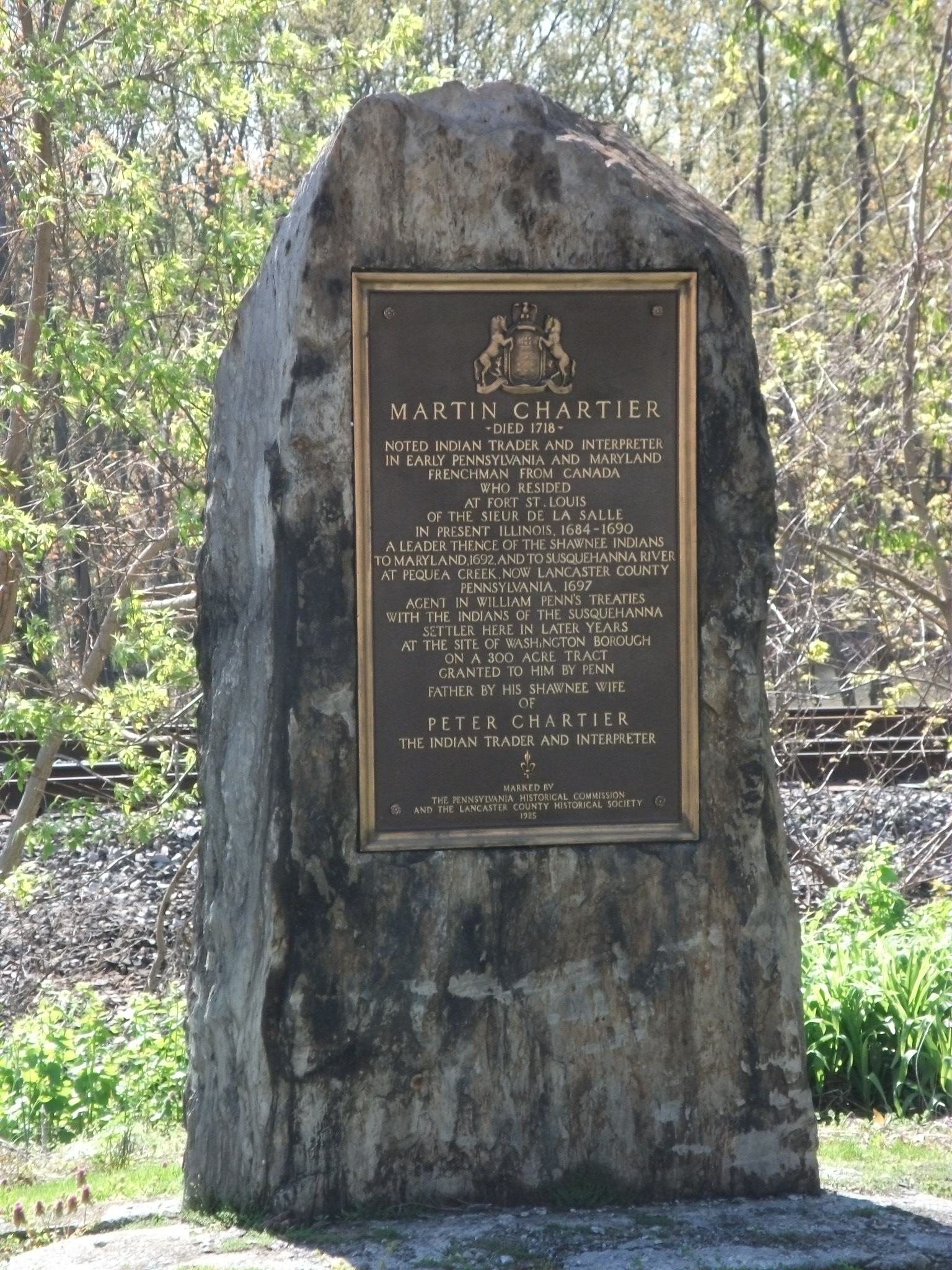
Historical marker in Washington Boro, Pennsylvania, commemorating the life of Peter Chartier's father, Martin Chartier.

Pierre Chartier married his first cousin, Blanceneige-Wapakonee Opessa (1695–1737), daughter of Opessa Straight Tail and his wife, about 1710. They had three children together: François "Pale Croucher" (b. 1712), René "Pale Stalker" (b. 1720), and Anna (b. 1730). In 1717, Governor William Penn granted his father Martin a 300-acre tract of land along the Conestoga River in Lancaster County, Pennsylvania. (One source says the grant was for 500 acres.). Together the father and son established a trading post in Conestoga Town. In 1718 they moved to Dekanoagah on Yellow Breeches Creek near the Susquehanna River. Martin Chartier died there in April of that year.

Chartier's father's funeral was attended by James Logan, a future Mayor of Philadelphia. Immediately afterward, Logan seized Martin Chartier's 250-acre estate, saying that Martin owed him a debt of 108 pounds, 19 shillings, and 3 and 3/4 pence. Logan had Peter Chartier (as he was now called) and his family evicted, and also expelled a community of Conestoga who were living on the property. He later sold the property to Stephen Atkinson for 30 pounds.

== Career as a trader ==
Logan permitted Chartier to maintain his trading post on the land as a tenant. Eventually Chartier opened another post at Paxtang on the Susquehanna River. (A 1736 map of Paxtang Manor by surveyor Edward Smout shows the home of Peter Chartier [spelled "Peter Shottea"] in what is today New Cumberland, Pennsylvania.). Although Chartier eventually became a wealthy landowner, his experience with Logan embittered him. It was one of the reasons he turned against the Provincial Government.

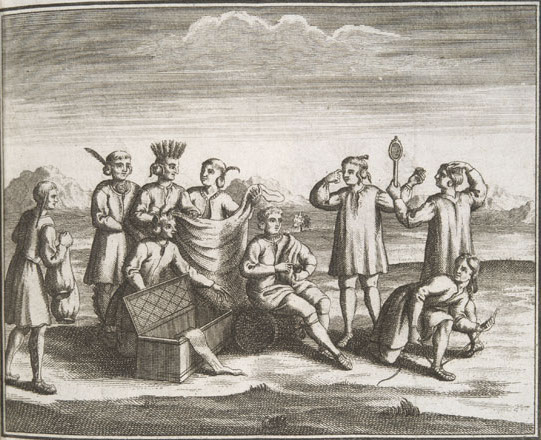
1722 woodcut of Native Americans with various western goods that they received in trade for furs.

On 3 November 1730 Peter Chartier was licensed by the English court in Lancaster County to trade with the Indians in south-western Pennsylvania. By 1732 Chartier, who was tri-lingual in Shawnee, French and English, had become well known as a negotiator between the Shawnee and the traders who came to sell them goods.

The Quaker trader Edmund Cartlidge wrote to Governor Patrick Gordon on 14 May 1732:

I find Peter Chartiere well inclined, and stands firm by the interest of Pennsylvania, and very ready on all accounts to do all the service he can. And as he has the Shawnise Tongue very perfect, and [is] well looked upon among them, he may do a great deal of good.

In September and October 1732, Chartier and Cartlidge served as interpreters during a conference in Philadelphia attended by Opakethwa and Opakeita, two Shawnee chiefs, with Thomas Penn, Governor Gordon, and the 72-member Pennsylvania Provincial Council. Also with Chartier and the two chiefs was Quassenung, son of Shawnee chief Kakowatcheky. The minutes of the conference record that both Opakethwa and Quassenung died of smallpox during their visit to Philadelphia.

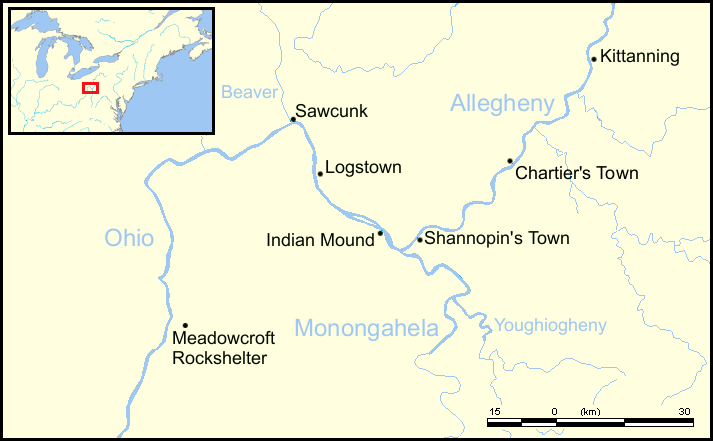
Map showing Native American communities in southwestern Pennsylvania, including Chartier's Town.

== Conflict with the colonial government ==
=== Alcohol abuse and Native Americans in Pennsylvania ===
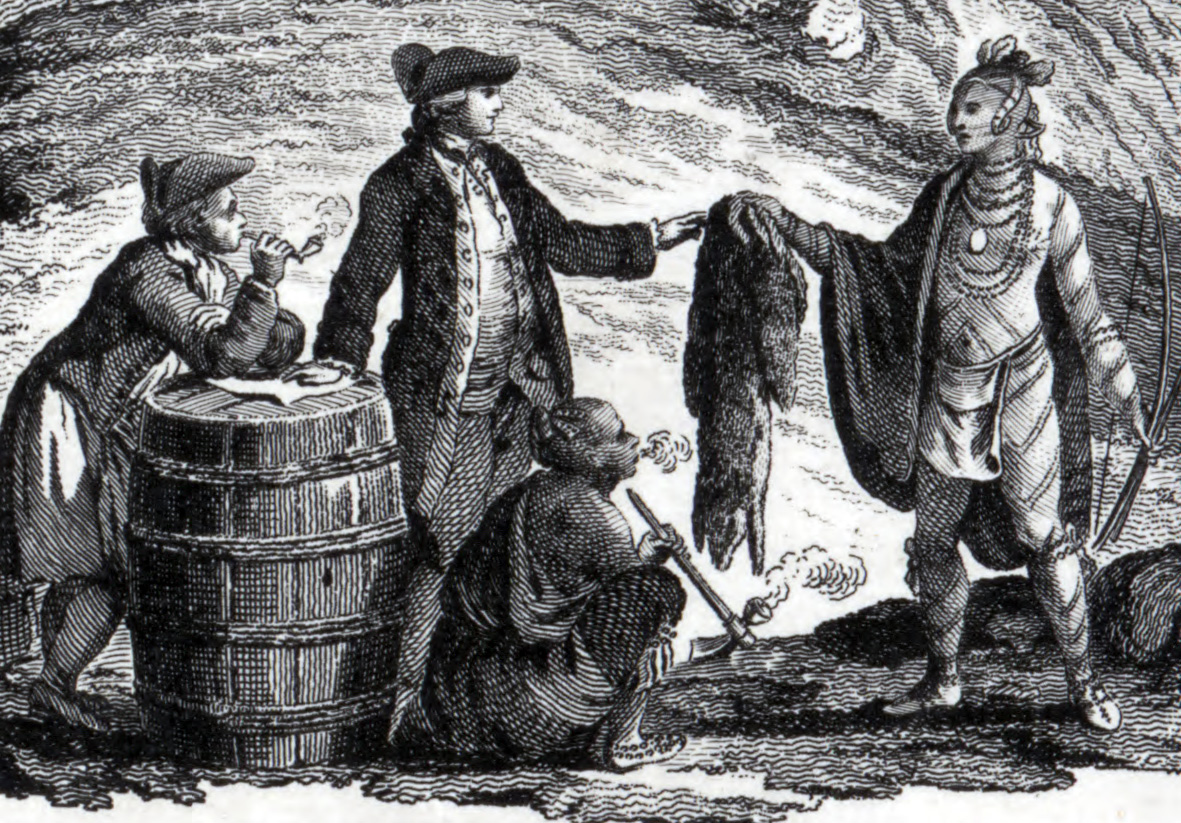
Fur traders doing business with Native Americans in 1777, with a barrel of rum to the left.

Beginning around 1675, traders had been selling rum in Shawnee communities. Several violent deaths were attributed to its influence. In October 1701 the Pennsylvania Assembly had prohibited the sale of rum to Native American people.

Because the law was poorly enforced in the frontier society, and the penalty was light—a fine of ten pounds and confiscation of any illegal supplies—traders continued to use rum to barter for furs. Traders soon began selling rum on credit in order to extort furs and skins and labor from the Shawnee.

By the early 1700s the effects of alcohol abuse were damaging Shawnee communities. Rum, brandy and other distilled beverages had become important trade items, frequently served in diplomatic councils, treaty negotiations, and political transactions and had become part of Native American gift-giving rituals. The adverse effects of alcohol among Native Americans included an erosion of civility, an increase in violence and widespread health problems. Alcohol made men less reliable hunters and allies, destabilized village economics, and contributed to a rise in poverty among Native Americans.

Native American leaders objected to the widespread use of alcohol. The minutes of the Provincial Council of Pennsylvania for 16 May 1704 record a complaint submitted by Chief Ortiagh of the Conestoga Indians:

Great quantities of rum [are] continually brought to their town, insomuch as they [are] ruined by it, having nothing left but have laid out all, even their clothes, for rum, and may now, when threatened with war, be surprised by their enemies when beside themselves with drink, and so be utterly destroyed.

=== Attempts to control the sale of alcohol ===
On 24 April 1733 the Shawnee chiefs at "Allegania" sent a petition to Governor Gordon complaining that "There is yearly and monthly some new upstart of a trader without license, who comes amongst us and brings with him nothing but rum ..." and asking permission to destroy the casks of rum: "We therefore beg thou would take it into consideration, and send us two firm orders, one for Peter Chartier, the other for us, to break in pieces all the [casks] so brought."

On 1 May 1734 several Shawnee chiefs dictated a letter to a trader, probably Jonah Davenport: it listed the names of fifteen traders who either had no license or had shown undesirable behavior, such as frequent disputes or violence. Chartier was among seven who were listed as in good standing. The chiefs would allow those men to bring up to 60 gallons of rum a year to their communities, as long as they had a valid license. Chartier was described as "one of us, and he is welcome to come as long as he pleases ... [and] to bring what quantity [of rum] he pleases ..." The letter concludes, "And for our parts, if we see any other traders than those we desire amongst us, we will stave their [casks] and seize their goods." The Shawnee believed that control over the sale of rum would reduce problems resulting from its abuse.

=== Prohibition of rum in Shawnee communities ===
By 1737 Chartier had become chief of the Pekowi Turtle Clan, with whom he was living. He decided to prohibit the sale of rum in Shawnee communities in his area, and persuaded other chiefs to do the same.

In a letter of 20 March 1738, addressed to Thomas Penn and Acting Governor James Logan, three Shawnee chiefs stated:

All our people being gathered together, we held a council together, to leave off drinking for the space of four years, and we all in general agreed to it, taking into consideration the ill consequences that attend it and what disturbance it makes, and that two of our brothers, the Mingoes, lost their lives in our towns by rum, and that we would live in peace and quietness and become another people ... The proposal of stopping the rum and all strong liquors was made to the rest [of the tribe] in the winter, and they were all willing. As soon as it was concluded of, all the rum that was in the Towns was all staved and spilled, belonging both to Indians and white people, which in quantity consisted of about forty gallons, that was thrown in the street, and we have appointed four men to stave all the rum or strong liquors that is brought to the Towns hereafter, either by Indians or white men, during the four years. We would be glad if our brothers would send strict orders that we might prevent the rum coming to the hunting cabins or to the neighboring towns. We have sent wampum to the French, to the Five Nations, to the Delaware ... to tell them not to bring any rum to our towns, for we want none ... so we would be glad if our brothers would inform the traders not bring any for we are sorry, after they have brought it a great way, for them to have it broke, and when they're once warned they will take care.

Chartier and ninety-eight Shawnee signed a pledge that accompanied the letter: it agreed that all rum should be spilled, and four men should be appointed for every town to prevent rum or strong liquor being brought into their towns for four years. Governor Patrick Gordon sent Chartier a reprimand over this issue. Traders continued to take rum into Shawnee communities, including several traders whom the Shawnees had specifically requested be barred from their territory.

For several years the French government had been trying to win the support of indigenous communities as part of their competition with the British in North America. In 1740 the Governor of New France, Charles de la Boische, Marquis de Beauharnois, invited Chartier and other Shawnee leaders to meet in Montreal to discuss relocating to Detroit (then under French control) and forming an alliance. In a letter of 25 June 1740 Chartier declined, promising to visit Montreal the following year (a promise which he apparently did not keep).

Tensions with the Pennsylvania government escalated in 1743. On 6 June three traders testified to the Pennsylvania Provincial Council that two other men had been killed, and that they had been told by the Shawnee to leave their territory or risk death. The governor regarded the Shawnee actions as provocation to violence. He wrote to the Pennsylvania Assembly alleging that Chartier's Shawnee ancestry resulted in his having a "brutish disposition ... and it is not to be doubted that a person of his savage temper will do us all the mischief he can."

In 1743 Chartier moved to Shannopin's Town, a Lenape village. He established a trading post on the Allegheny River about twenty miles upstream from the forks of the Ohio near the mouth of Chartiers Run, at what became Tarentum. It was known as Chartier's Town at the time, and Chartier's Old Town after it was abandoned in 1745. Several Shawnee communities from the Chalahgawtha, Pekowi and Mekoche bands later resettled near Chartier's Town.

=== Chartier's flight from Pennsylvania, 1745 ===
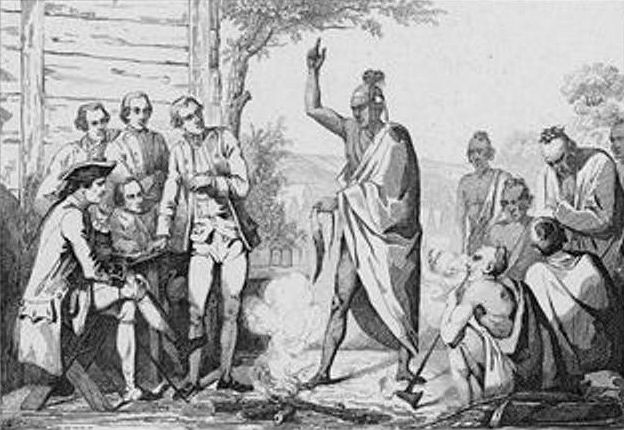
Conference between French and Native American leaders around 1750, by Émile Louis Vernier

Frustrated in his efforts to control the rum trade, Chartier decided to lead his band away from the area. In April 1745 Chartier accepted a military commission from the French. With some 400 Pekowi Shawnee, he left their settlement and headed southwest.

In July 1745 traders James Dunning (who had been banned by the Shawnee in 1734) and Peter Tostee appeared in Philadelphia. They claimed to authorities that they had been robbed on the frontier on 18 April:

... as they were returning up the Allegheny River in canoes, from a trading trip, with a considerable quantity of furs and skins, Peter Chartier, late an Indian Trader, with about 400 Shawnese Indians, armed with guns, pistols and cutlasses, suddenly took them prisoners, having, as he said, a captain's commission from the King of France; and plundered them of all their effects to the value of sixteen hundred pounds.

George Croghan, another trader, later testified that Chartier had set free a Black servant, possibly a slave, who was traveling with Dunning and Tostee.

The Pennsylvania provincial council issued an indictment against "Peter Chartier of Lancaster County ... Labourer [who], being moved and seduced by the instigation of the Devil ... falsely, traitorously, unlawfully and treasonably did compass, imagine and intend open war, insurrection and rebellion against our said Lord the King." Chartier's landholdings in Pennsylvania, totaling some 600 acres, were seized and turned over to Thomas Lawrence, a business partner of Edward Shippen, III.

Chartier led his Shawnee band to Logstown, where he attempted to persuade chief Kakowatcheky to join him, but was refused. Chartier and his people proceeded to Lower Shawneetown on the Ohio River, where they took refuge for a few weeks. Chartier and his people recognized that, by defying the Provincial Governor and accepting French patronage, they had to leave Pennsylvania, which was under British control. In June an anonymous Frenchman visited Lower Shawneetown, sent by Paul-Joseph Le Moyne de Longueuil, commandant at Detroit, to take charge of captives Chartier was presumed to have taken when he robbed traders Dunning and Tostee. Chartier had released the traders after robbing them, however.

The Frenchman observed Chartier trying unsuccessfully to persuade the leaders of Lower Shawneetown to accept French alliance:

They held a council to...hear the reading of Longueuil's letter. After this Chartiers took the [French] flag and planted it in front of one of the big chiefs of the village, saying to them: "This is what yours sends you, to continue to [do] the bidding of the general." They all took up arms, saying...they would have nothing to do with it...if the French could bring them back...it was only to make slaves of them...but Chartiers told them that he would not listen to them.

This Frenchman watched the Shawnee who had accompanied Chartier performing a two-day "Death Feast," a ceremony conducted before abandoning a village.

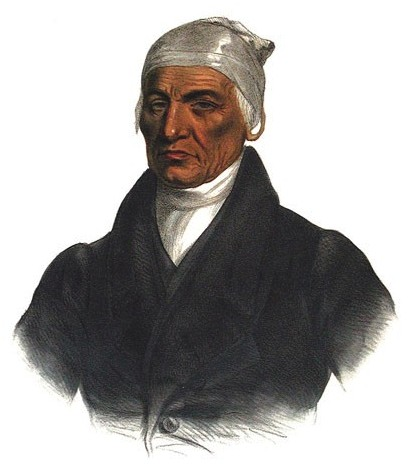
Black Hoof (Catecahassa) was a member of Chartier's nomadic Shawnee band. From the History of the Indian Tribes of North America.

The Shawnees were accustomed to relocating. On 24 June 1745 the group left Lower Shawneetown, traveled down the Ohio River as far as the Great Miami River and in August proceeded south to Kentucky. Some historians state that he established a new community called Eskippakithiki, while others believe that this is probably inaccurate, and that Chartier never actually lived there, although "a band of Shawnee may have established the village in 1750 or 1751 and it may have been abandoned in 1754 due to attacks by the Catawbas." According to Charles Augustus Hanna (1911):

Proceeding southwards along the Catawba Trail, they established a town about a mile west of the oil spring on what was afterwards called Lulbegrud Creek, a northern tributary of the Red River of Kentucky, about twelve miles east of the site of the present town of Winchester, Clark County.

Fighting with Iroquois and Chickasaw and an outbreak of smallpox led them to move south to the Coosa River in 1748, where they founded the village of Chalakagay, near what is now Sylacauga, Alabama. Black Hoof (1740–1831), then a child, was with this band and recalled the journey in later years when he was a chief. In May 1749 Antoine Louis Rouillé, the French Foreign minister, wrote: "[Chartier's] band, after ascending a part of the river of the Cherakis, decided to go and join the Alibamons, where it appeared to have behaved well."

The Pennsylvania government continued to offer a bounty for Chartier as late as 1747, when James Adair tried to catch him in South Carolina. Adair later wrote:

I headed a company of the cheerful, brave Chickasaw, with the eagles' tails, to the camp of the Shawano Indians, to apprehend one Peter Shartie (a Frenchman), who, ...had decoyed a large body of the Shawano from the English to the French interest. But, fearing the consequences he went round an hundred miles toward the Cheerake nation...and thereby evaded the danger.

== Visit to Detroit, 1747 ==
Chartier appeared in Detroit in 1747 to meet with Roland-Michel Barrin de La Galissonière and explain why his Shawnee band did not move to Detroit. (Records are unclear and the Chartier at the meeting may have been one of his sons.) The French had hoped to lure large numbers of Shawnee and other tribes away from British influence, but Chartier, Meshemethequater, and Neucheconeh were the only Shawnee leaders to accept French patronage. His band preferred to settle on the Wabash River, which is where they had been living when Martin Chartier first encountered them in 1674. The French expected that, because of his French ancestry, Chartier would be inclined to bring his people into alliance with the French. Chartier remained beyond either French or English dominance, consistent with Shawnee values of autonomy. After leaving Detroit, Chartier visited Terre Haute, Indiana, a French settlement on the Wabash.

== Division of Chartier's people, 1748 ==
Chartier's Shawnee band split several times; some remained in Lower Shawneetown. In the summer of 1748 more than a hundred, led by Chartier's cousin Meshemethequater, returned to Pennsylvania. Chartier's defection to the French had caused much concern among the British authorities as the Provincial government feared that other Shawnee and possibly other tribes would become French allies.

In July the Pennsylvania Provincial Council appointed a commission to meet with the Shawnee who had returned, and instructed them:

As to the Shawonese you are to enquire very exactly after their conduct since the commencement of the War, and what lengths they went in favor of Peter Chartier; where he is; and what he has been doing all this time; and be careful that these people acknowledge their fault in plain terms, and promise never to be guilty of any behaviour again that may give such reason to suspect their fidelity.

In council with Scarouady on 20 July, Meshemethequater submitted an apology for having joined with Chartier. In a letter to Conrad Weiser dated 23 June 1748 Anthony Palmer, President of the Pennsylvania Provincial Council, said, "...they relented, made acknowledgment to the Government of their error in being seduced by Peter Chartier, and prayed they might be permitted to return to their old Town."

== Resettlement in Illinois ==
Chartier and about 270 Shawnee left Alabama and moved to French Lick on the Cumberland River in modern-day Tennessee, Chartier's birthplace. They stayed there until fighting with the Chickasaw forced them to leave. According to Lyman C. Draper, the band, then numbering about 190,

...made their way down Cumberland River, the women, children, aged and disabled men, in canoes, and the warriors as a guard along shore; intending to rejoin their brethren, who were now located on the Ohio, chiefly at the Lower Shawanoe Town, at the mouth of the Scioto; but when they entered the Ohio, the heavy spring flood was rolling down, against which their progress was so slow and tedious, that they stopped a few miles below the mouth of the Wabash, at the present locality of Old Shawneetown, Illinois. Remaining there awhile, the French Traders and Kaskaskia Indians invited them to take up their abode at Kaskaskia.

In 1750, however, tensions developed between the Shawnee and the established tribes, the Illinois Confederation, made up of the Piankashaw, Kickapoo and the Mascoutin peoples. Fighting ensued until Chartier signed a treaty brokered by the Marquis de Vaudreuil in Mobile, Alabama on 24 June 1750.

Chartier encouraged Vaudreuil to consider the Shawnee a unified nation (although they were quite decentralized). He reaffirmed Shawnee loyalty to the French: "[H]is entire nation was entirely devoted to us [the French]," the Marquis later wrote. "[I]t is well to show this nation certain considerations in view of the fact that it has always been strongly attached to us." This was significant as the French tried to garner Native American loyalty in preparation for war.

== Participation in the French and Indian War ==
The French and Indian War was the front in North America of the Seven Years' War between Britain and France. In June 1754 Chartier, his Shawnee warriors, and his two sons, François and René were present when Captain Joseph Coulon de Jumonville was killed at the Battle of Jumonville Glen. In July 1754 he and his sons participated in the French victory over George Washington at the Battle of Fort Necessity. Both of Chartier's sons fought against the British in numerous engagements during the French and Indian War. René may have been killed with Shawnee chief Cornstalk when he was detained at Fort Randolph in November 1777.

== Death ==
Peter Chartier was last seen in 1758 in a village on the Wabash River. His band was referred to in a 1760 letter from Governor-General Vaudreuil-Cavagnial:

"In the last days of the month of June of [1759], five Chaouoinons [Shawnees] of [Chartier]'s band came...to ask him for a piece of ground, as theirs was not good. M. de MacCarty sent some provisions to those Indians, whom he placed near Fort Massac. They were more useful and less dangerous there than when collected together at Sonyote [Lower Shawneetown].

There is some evidence that Chartier (and his mother Sewatha Straight Tail) died in an outbreak of smallpox that had originated in 1757 in Quebec. It spread through Native American communities across North America.

== Legacy ==
Historian Richard White characterizes Chartier's rise to power as unique among the Shawnee:

Chartier was a political chameleon whose changes in coloring reflected opportunities rather than convictions, but it is the scope of his transformation that is most revealing. Chartier's switch from a British to a French partisan is perhaps less significant than his metamorphosis from métis trader to Shawnee factional leader. Originally he was an important but marginal political figure, a man who acted through the chiefs, tying them to him through debts or gifts. Eventually he became a man who challenged chiefs, and ultimately, he acted like a chief himself...By 1750 he had legitimized his position.

=== Chartier's role as interpreter and negotiator ===
Early in his career, Peter Chartier served as a capable intermediary. He bridged the cultural gap between the English and the Native American tribes of the Ohio Valley and Western Pennsylvania by acting as an interpreter and negotiator who played a crucial part in maintaining good relations with local tribes, establishing military alliances, and promoting trade. Many other Métis traders and explorers of mixed Native American-French ancestry also served in this role, along with Europeans who had assimilated into Native American communities. They typically spoke English, French and (sometimes several) Native American languages fluently, and understood both European and Native American customs and values. The best-known of these are Louis-Thomas Chabert de Joncaire and his son Philippe-Thomas Chabert de Joncaire; several members of the Montour family, including Madam Montour, her son Andrew Montour and grandson Nicholas Montour; and Augustin Langlade and his son Charles Michel de Langlade.

=== Regulation of the sale of alcohol in Native American communities ===
Chartier's decision to join the French and to lead his community out of Pennsylvania sparked fears that Native Americans would attack British settlements. As a result, the Pennsylvania provincial government finally took measures to comply with the repeated requests of Shawnee leaders to control the practice of trading rum for furs. On 7 May 1745, shortly after Chartier had announced his defection to the French, Lieutenant-Governor George Thomas issued a proclamation stating:

Whereas frequent complaints have been made by the Indians, and of late earnestly renewed, that divers gross irregularities and abuses have been committed in the Indian countries, and that many of their people have been cheated and inflamed to such a degree by means of strong liquors being brought and sold amongst them contrary to the said laws, as to endanger their own lives and the lives of others ... I do hereby strictly enjoin the magistrates of the several counties within this province, and especially those of the county of Lancaster, where these abuses are mostly carried on, to be very vigilant.

Thomas strengthened the law against the sale of rum in indigenous communities, doubled the fine to twenty pounds, required a surety bond of one hundred pounds from anyone applying for a license to trade furs with Native Americans, required that the goods of traders traveling to indigenous communities be searched, and gave

...full power and authority to any Indian or Indians to whom rum or other strong liquors shall be hereafter offered for sale contrary to the said laws, to stave and break to pieces the cask or vessel in which such rum or other strong liquor is contained.

Although the proclamation was more strongly worded than previous ones, it was not strictly enforced. Alcohol abuse continued to be an increasing problem in indigenous communities.

=== Native American self-determination ===
Historian Stephen Warren describes Peter Chartier as an "audacious example of independence [which] infuriated Englishmen and Frenchmen alike," saying that Chartier

...encouraged Pan-Indian expressions of unity ... He discovered valuable lessons in movement and reinvention and ... turned Shawnee histories of migration and violence toward adoption of a new racial consciousness for Indian peoples in the eastern half of North America.

Warren argues that both Peter and his French father, Martin Chartier, influenced Shawnee attitudes toward their neighbors and rivals, both European and Native American:

The Shawnees ... modeled themselves after men such as Martin and Peter Chartier, who moved between regions and empires in a single lifetime. Like the Chartiers, the Shawnees refused to acquiesce to French, English, or Iroquois "overlords." Frustratingly independent, Shawnee migrants made deliberate choices based on the realities of Indian slavery, intertribal warfare, and access to European trade goods.

== See also ==
- Kakowatcheky
- Martin Chartier
- Peter Bisaillon
- Jacques Le Tort
- Meshemethequater
- Lower Shawneetown
- Opessa Straight Tail
- French and Indian War
- North American fur trade
- Alcohol and Native Americans
- Alcohol in New France
- Native American temperance activists
