= Peter Bisaillon =

New France fur trader and interpreter

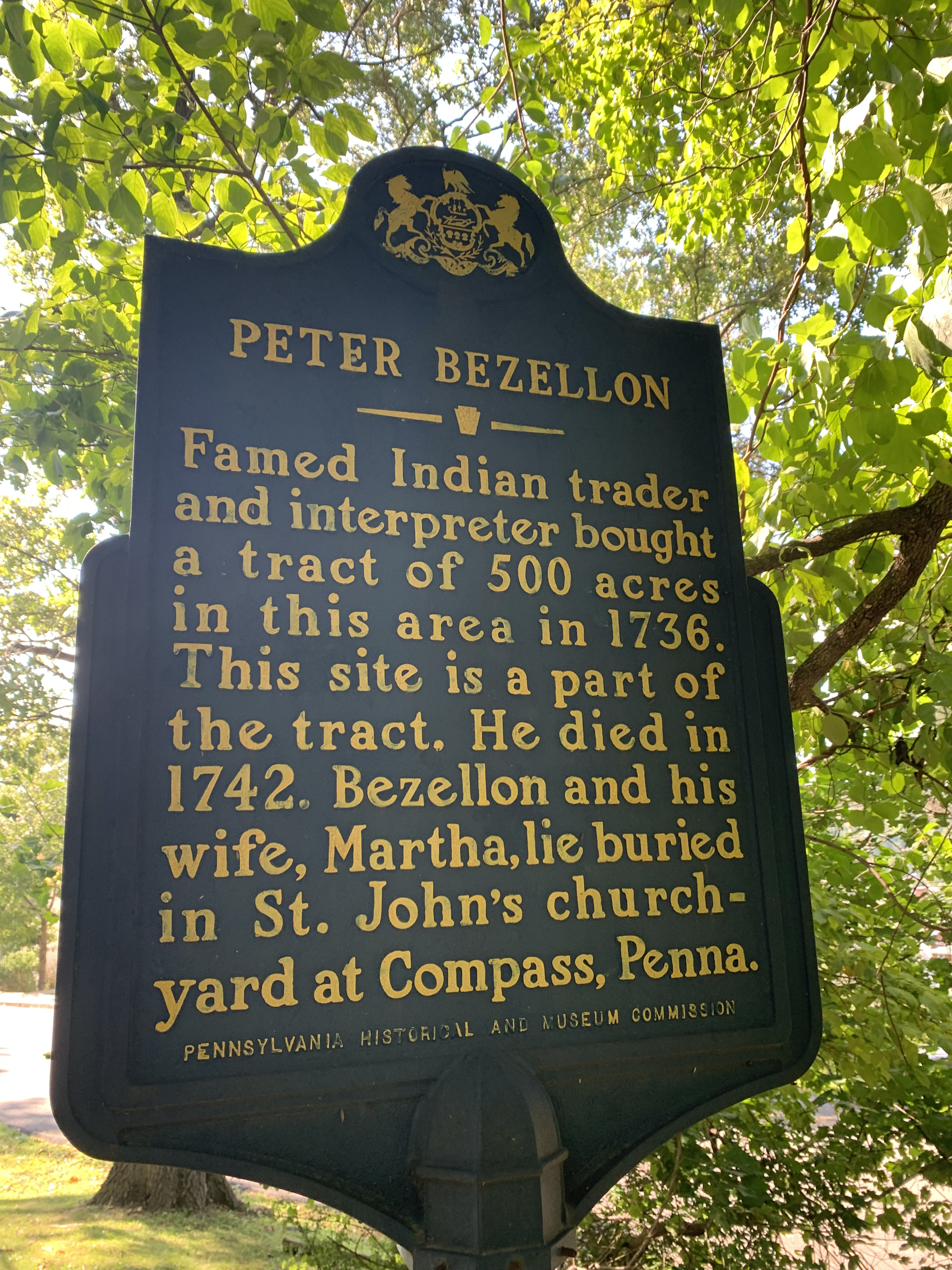
- Pennsylvania state historical marker in Coatesville
- Born: Pierre Bisaillon c. 1662; Saint-Jean-d'Aubrigoux, diocese of Clermont, Auvergne (province), France
- Died: July 18, 1742 (aged 80) near Conoy Township, Lancaster County, Pennsylvania
- Occupations: Explorer, fur trader, interpreter, coureur des bois
- Years active: 1686–1728
- Known for: Travels with Henri de Tonti and collaboration with James Logan
- Spouses: Martha Combe (1693–1764), Marie Thérèse Kouaga or Osunesa
- Parent(s): Benoit Bisaillon (b. 1638) and Louise-Françoise Blaise Dublay (b. 1642)
- Relatives: Brothers: Benoit Bisaillon (1663–1700); Michel Bisaillon (1660–c. 1728); Étienne Bisaillon (1659–1697); Daughter: Jahanna Beselion (b. 1690)

Peter Bisaillon (also Bezellon, Bizaillon, and other spellings), (baptized Pierre) (c. 1662 – 18 July 1742) was a New France fur trader and interpreter who spent most of his career in Pennsylvania engaged in trade with Native American communities. Bisaillon and other coureurs des bois dominated the Pennsylvania fur trade during the late 17th and early 18th century, as they were skilled hunters and trappers and had established good relations with local Native American tribes. Bisaillon and his colleagues were regarded with suspicion by Pennsylvania authorities, however, and he was frequently accused and jailed on false or minor charges. He was eventually forced out of the fur trade, but retired a wealthy man.

== Birth and immigration to North America ==
Bisaillon was born in Saint-Jean-d'Aubrigoux, diocese of Clermont, Auvergne, (dept. of Haute-Loire) France to Benoit Bisaillon (b. 1638) and Louise-Françoise Blaise Dublay (b. 1642). He came to New France with his three brothers (Étienne, Benoit, and Michel) in about 1680. He and his brothers were probably inspired to move to Canada by the example of their cousin Mathieu Faye (1641-1695), who was serving in the Carignan-Salières Regiment in Quebec.

=== Brothers ===
Étienne Bisaillon purchased land in Laprairie outside Montreal in November, 1682 and all four brothers occupied themselves in trading with various native tribes. Étienne began trading in 1683 with the Odawa and became a wealthy landowner with a home in Montreal, although he frequently entered into debt to pay for equipment and supplies on his trading journeys. He was killed by Iroquois Indians at Laprairie on 25 September 1697.

Benoit Bisaillon worked as a trader with the Sioux for several years, then purchased land and became a farmer outside Montreal. In June 1700 he drowned while traveling in a canoe between Laprairie and Montreal.

Michel Bisaillon was involved in fur trading between Detroit and New York, and eventually partnered with his brother Peter in Pennsylvania trading. His association with the English fur trade raised questions in Montreal about his loyalty to France. Hoping to clear his name with French authorities, Michel used his trade relationship with the Illinois Indians to mobilize their support for the French. At the beginning of the First Fox War in 1715, he led hundreds of Illinois warriors to aid the French in an attack on the Meskwaki. He was thereafter banned from trading in Pennsylvania and lived out the rest of his life in Laprairie.

Some sources also refer to a Louis Bisaillon, a Claude Bisaillon, and a Richard Bisaillon.

== Career ==
=== Travels with Henri de Tonti ===
In February 1686, Pierre (Peter) Bisaillon was one of twenty-five men who went with Henri de Tonti to search for René-Robert Cavelier, Sieur de La Salle at the mouth of the Mississippi, but they failed to locate him. They returned up the river and established the Arkansas Post, the first European settlement in the lower Mississippi River Valley, where traders would exchange French goods with the local Quapaw for beaver furs. They then returned to Montreal.

=== Early business venture, 1687 ===
In 1687, Bisaillon entered into a partnership with Gédéon Petit and the Sieur de Salvaye, (Pierre Salvaye Tremont), two coureurs des bois who were wanted by French authorities for breaking trading rules by trafficking with the English and so had transferred their operations to Albany from Montreal (where Salvaye had served as an ambassador and Petit had managed a brothel). In a letter from New York dated 4 July 1687, Governor Thomas Dongan wrote to a Seneca chief:

I have given leave to Mr. Gideon & Salvay & his Company, being french that Run away from Canida, to goe up by ye way of Susquehanne & trade amongst ye Indians. They have my Passe & you must tell yr People to do them No harme being gone upon Discovery.

The trading venture ended when their boat sank and their cargo was lost. In a letter from Pennsylvania Governor William Markham to Governor Francis Nicholson of Maryland on 26 June 1696, Markham says:

I enclose to your Excellency what I found among castaway papers. Basalion was in equal partnership with Petit and Salvay, though it went in only their two names, Basalion coming in after the others had provided for the voyage, and after the voyage was overthrown, I divided the left cargo, and Basalion had one-third.

=== Partnership with Jacques Le Tort ===
In about 1688, Bisaillon arrived in Pennsylvania, "poor and miserable," and joined the trading company of Jacques Le Tort, a Huguenot refugee. Le Tort was employed by the New Mediterranean Sea Company managed by Daniel Coxe and Matthias Vincent, who attempted to establish a colony of French Huguenots in East and West Vincent Township, Pennsylvania and planned to create an empire in the Indian trade on the south shore of Lake Erie. However, the colony failed as Huguenot families did not want to move from Philadelphia to wild lands along the Susquehanna River, although Jacques Le Tort and his wife Anne established a homestead there. Vincent died in 1687 and Coxe sold the company to the London Company in 1692, but Bisaillon and other coureurs des bois went on trading in Pennsylvania. Bisaillon eventually went to work for the Pennsylvania Company and its manager Robert Quary. When a band of Shawnees came into Pennsylvania in 1694, Bisaillon met his old friend Martin Chartier, who had been on La Salle's 1679 expedition, but had mutinied and fled. He had married a Shawnee woman and assimilated into her band.

By the late 1690s, the Canadian fur trade network had become so well-developed that there was a glut of furs coming into Quebec, leading to a drop in prices. For a few years, Bisaillon, Chartier and Le Tort ran a smuggling operation, bringing furs from Detroit to Albany and Pennsylvania, where the English paid a higher price for them.

On 4 May 1696, Casperus Augustine Herman, son of Augustine Herman and Lord of Bohemia Manor, wrote to the Maryland Provincial Council that:

"Peter Basilion does now live at St. John's, in Chester County, Pennsylvania, but formerly lived thirty miles backwards from any inhabitants, where he treated with the Indians, and was then reported that...Capt. Le Tort, a Frenchman, does now live back in the woods in the same place where the said Basilion formerly lived, and trades with the Indians."

This indicates that Bisaillon decided to move out of the backcountry, closer to a town such as Downingtown, while his colleague Jacques Le Tort took over the direct trade with the Native Americans who supplied most of their furs.

=== Legal problems in Pennsylvania ===
Pennsylvania authorities including William Penn suspected that Bisaillon and other coureurs des bois such as Le Tort and Chartier were spying for the French, that they were "very dangerous persons" who "kept private correspondence with the Canida Indians and the French," who "entertained strange Indians in remote and obscure places," and who "uttered suspicious words." They were harassed, arrested and imprisoned, often on false or minor charges.

==== Conspiracy trial, 1693-04 ====
In response to rumors that Canada was preparing for an invasion, Mrs. Anne Le Tort, Peter Bisaillon, and a man named Captain Dubois were accused on 19 December 1693 before the Provincial Council of Pennsylvania of having carried on a secret correspondence in the year before with "the strange Indians called the Shall-Narooners (Shawnees) and the French of Canada." The accusation, by Thomas Jenner and Polycarpus Rose, stated that Bisaillon's servant had left a packet of letters from Peter, wrapped up in a blue linen cloth, which was then picked up by "James the Frenchman." She stated that "a certain Indian king" had told her that Peter Bisaillon had said to him that "they were not like to hold the land much longer, for that they were not satisfied for it." Another witness testified that "there had been Severall letters & powders sent to Canada by Peter Bisailion." This was presented as evidence of conspiracy. Bisaillon, Mrs. Le Tort and Dubois were imprisoned by Pennsylvania authorities on charges of conspiring with local tribes and with the coureurs des bois to seize control of Pennsylvania territory. After an investigation, Anne Le Tort was released but Bisaillon and Dubois were tried. They were eventually released on condition that they report to the Provincial Governor any hostile movement on the part of the French of which they had knowledge. As an added precaution, they were under constant surveillance.

==== Trafficking indictment, 1701 ====
In 1701, William Penn and the Council considered the case of "Peter Basailion [and his brother, probably Michel], who have been suspected to be very dangerous persons in their traffic with the Indians, in this troublesome conjuncture of affairs." The Council decided "that it was absolutely necessary the said two Frenchmen should be confined, and restrained from inhabiting or trading amongst the Indians." Peter Bisaillon was indicted on charges of "trafficking with the savages," which was an attempt to pressure him into obtaining a formal trader's license issued by the Province of Pennsylvania.

==== Espionage charges, 1702 ====
In 1702, Robert Quary, Surveyor General of the Customs for New Jersey and Pennsylvania, and a former employer of Peter Bisaillon, accused Bisaillon of having been sent to Pennsylvania from Quebec as a spy, and informed the Provincial Council that "the French are settling themselves on the back of Pennsylvania, about four days journey from New Castle, and...offered this Article to show the danger of the Country for want of a due provision for their defence." At a hearing in London on 9 June 1702, Jacques Le Tort, Bisaillon's business partner, testified in Bisaillon's defense, describing their long friendship after Bisaillon's arrival in the Province:

M. Le Tort, a Frenchman, who has lived many years in that country, was heard, at Mr. Penn's request. He said that ...Peter Bezallion, the pretended [spy], came to Pennsylvania poor and miserable, and hath been helped by him [Le Tort] and other Refugees to work for their living...having lived there about...13 or 14 [years].

==== Confiscation of goods, 1708 ====
In 1703, Peter was granted a license to trade with the local tribes after making a deposit of five hundred pounds, guaranteeing his "loyalty to the province." He was obliged to give security bonds several times between 1700 and 1711. In 1708, Bisaillon's goods were seized by the Admiralty Court in Philadelphia, by order of the Admiralty Judge Robert Quary, who still suspected him in his dealings with the French and Indians. On 24 June 1708 James Logan wrote on his behalf to William Penn:

...Peter Barzalion who has long traded here, and behaved himself well last year had some Indian goods seized by the collector because imported by a foreigner...At his earnest request, I took his bond for it, everybody exclaiming against the severity for though a Frenchman, he had been very faithful, and believing that upon his application and thy knowledge of the matter, thou would not touch with it. For these nine months past, he has been out with Michel in quest of the mines, and in the meantime, unhappy, had another parcel of a greater value seized, which are also condemned...and was sold by the admiralty. I know not what to do in such a point, but must crave thy direction. He is desirous if he stays here to procure a denization from England, in which it would be kind to be helpful to him, for he is useful and accounted very honest by those who trade with him. But I fear he will leave us and if provoked, is capable of doing much hurt.

The mines referred to were supposed veins of silver ore reportedly discovered by the Swiss explorer Franz Ludwig Michel on the Potomac in 1707, and Michel engaged Chartier and James Le Tort as well as Bisaillon in several unsuccessful attempts to find them again.

In October 1708, Bisaillon was granted permission from Logan (who controlled the commissioners of property) to build a house and plant fields "on any of the Lands above Conestoga not Possesst or made use by the Indians...paying One Deer Skin yearly for the privilege."

==== Imprisonment, 1710 ====
In November 1709, James Logan was forced to flee to England after his arrest was ordered by the Pennsylvania Assembly, and without Logan's protection, Bisaillon was jailed again in March 1710 on accusations of loyalty to the French and plans to incite the Indians against the English. Deputy Governor Charles Gookin stated that:

...he has been informed one Peter Bizalion, a French man and...a trader amongst the Indians at Conestogo, has lately spoken some suspicious words and committed some misdemeanors, whereupon he had caused his Effects to be seized, the better to oblige him to appear and answer unto what should be laid to his Charge...The said Bizalion should enter into a Recognizance with the Queen, in five hundred pounds...for the said Bizalion's personal appearance...and his good behavior in the meantime, which being done, his Effects to be restored to him.

On August 22, 1711, after nearly eighteen months in jail, Bisaillon posted 508 pounds for bail and was ordered to appear at the next court session in Philadelphia. In 1712, Bisaillon was permitted to continue his trade with the Indians, once again with the assistance of James Logan, who had returned from England and wanted to establish a partnership with him.

=== Affiliation with James Logan ===
In 1712 Bisaillon was offered a partnership with William Penn's secretary, James Logan, who was growing politically powerful while nearly monopolizing the Indian trade. Logan built a trading post at Conestoga township on the Susquehanna River and Bisaillon, Le Tort and Chartier became key players in Logan's trading organization, supplying most of the furs for Logan for several years. A license document dated 15 October 1714 grants Bisaillon 250 acres of land, "at Peshtang or any other Indian Town or Place on Sasquehannah within this Province," with permission to build any necessary buildings "during his Trade there or till further order shall be given herein by the Proprietor or his Commissioners provided alwayes that the said Peter shall not act or proceed in any thing under colour hereof but by the free leave & approbation of the Indians amongst whom he dwells or resides." After Peter's brother Michel became involved in military activities against Indian tribes supporting the English in 1715, Logan felt compelled to replace his French traders with English colonials. Bisaillon and Chartier went on to establish trading posts in Paxtang, Pennsylvania. Chartier died in 1718.

James Logan maintained a good friendship with Bisaillon until the end of his life, and in 1719 he asked Isaac Taylor to survey land as a gift for Bisaillon and his wife, on the Susquehanna River near Conewago Creek. Seven hundred acres was surveyed for his wife Martha Bisaillon, and Peter built a home there. Logan's letter to Taylor says, in part:

Loving friend. Thou wilt receive from Peter Bizaillon himself the warrants on orders for surveying a thousand acres of land to his wife and her brother, in executing of which I doubt it will be difficult to reconcile his and Anne Le Tort's expectations, but I request thee to use thy endeavours. Peter will talk high, but generally harkens to reason. However, his and M. Combs' conveniency are principally to be regarded, tho' on the other hand I am very desirous the old gentlewoman should have some land that she may be fixed, and leave something to her grandchildren. Pray see that it be laid out of a sufficient depth; I think a mile and a half or a quarter, at least, is little enough, but this is left to thee, and thou art by no means to produce or mention this letter...Keep this wholly to thyself. Thy real friend, J. LOGAN.

A letter in French from James Logan to Bisaillon, dated 22 November 1725, mentions Logan's promise to visit Bisaillon's niece and discusses a land deal with James Le Tort, indicating Logan's ongoing friendship with Bisaillon.

Fluent in several Native American dialects, Bisaillon was employed as an Unami language interpreter for the Lenape at conferences in Philadelphia in 1717, 1720, 1721, and 1728 (together with Nicholas Scull II). He retired shortly afterwards on his estate of over 700 acres near Conoy Township, Lancaster County, Pennsylvania.

== Marriages and family ==
Some sources state that Bisaillon married a Native American woman, possibly of the Piscataway tribe, in 1697. She is referred to as Marie Thérèse Kouaga or Marie Thérèse Osunesa. She is mentioned only once in official records, but not by name, when she was asked to interpret in May, 1704: "Two Onondagoe Indians were again called to receive their answer and Peter Bezillion's wife being in town, who understands their language well, was also called to interpret." At least one source mentions that he had his children "baptized and adopted legally," but does not provide details. Marie Thérèse is described as "wise and prolific."

In a letter dated 27 August 1701, written to Peter from Jahanna Beselion, daughter of Jahanna Sioute, she claims him as her father and begs his acknowledgement. It is unknown what his response was.

In 1727, Bisaillon married Martha Combe (1693-1764) from Pennsylvania (one source says she was born in Scotland). She also occasionally served as an interpreter during conferences between local tribes and the provincial authorities. They apparently had no children. She died on 18 June 1764, and is buried beside him at St. John's Episcopal Church, in East Caln Township, Chester County, Pennsylvania.

== Death ==
He died on 18 July 1742 and, as he had no children, his property went to his wife's nephews. He names eight slaves in his will. He is buried at St. John's Episcopal Church, in East Caln Township, Chester County, Pennsylvania.

== Legacy ==
Bisaillon's trade route, one of the first roads in the area, which probably followed some well-traveled Indian trails, became known as "Old Peter’s Road." It dated from 1707 near Bareville to 1712 near Conoy Township, and ran from the Susquehanna east through Chester County, Delaware County and Downingtown to Philadelphia along what is now Pennsylvania Route 340. A historical marker with a map showing the original route of Old Peter's Road was erected by the Lancaster County Historical society in 1933.

"Bezallion's Cave," a cave used by Bisaillon to store furs and traps, was located on the west bank of the Schuylkill River, near what is now Spring City, Pennsylvania. It appears on several eighteenth-century maps of the area. The cave was very likely filled in during the construction of the Schuylkill Canal in 1825.
