= LeTort Spring Run Nature Trail =

Rail trail in Pennsylvania, United States

Coordinates: 40.18300°N 77.18719°W

Letort Spring Run Nature Trail
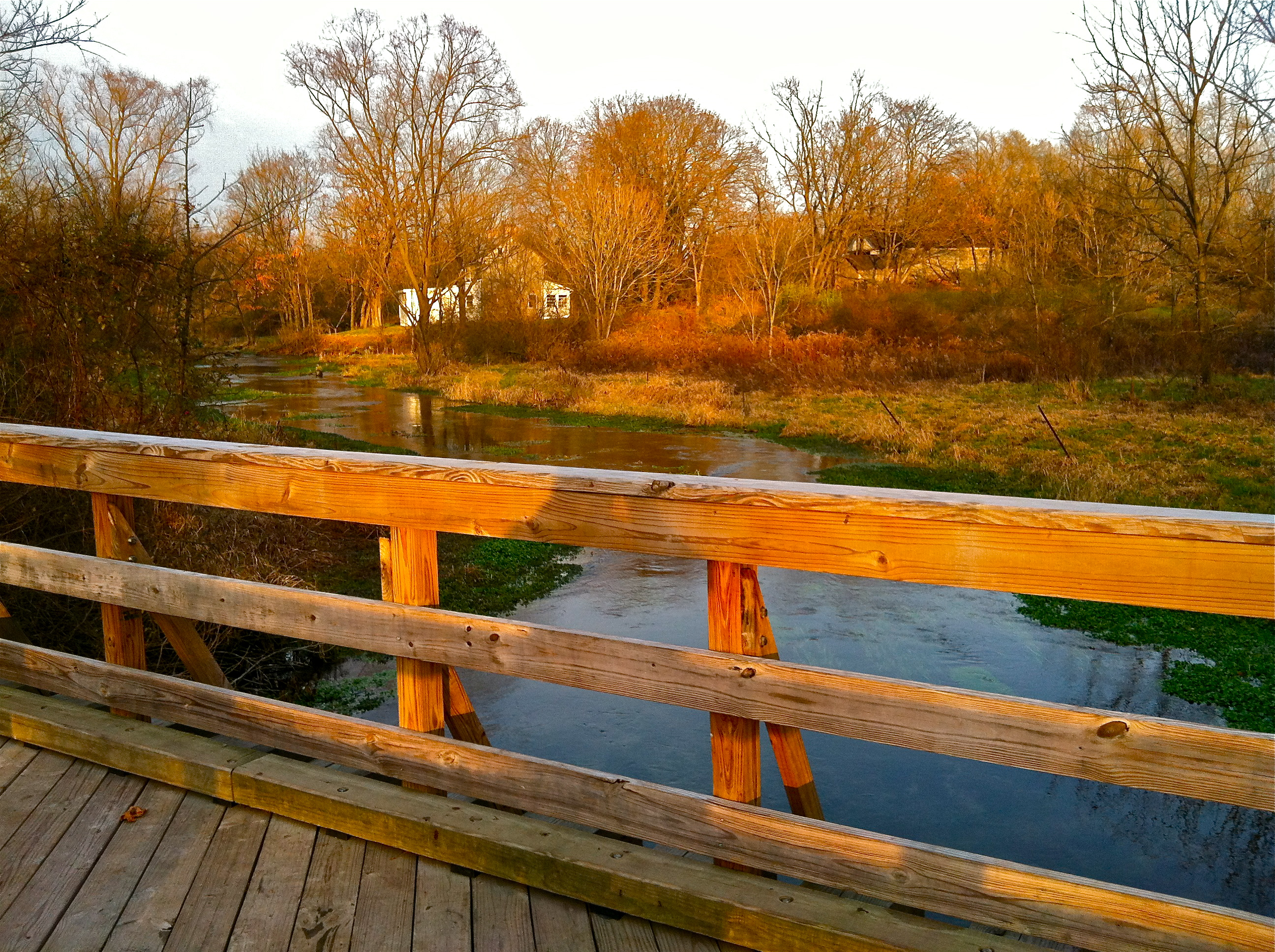
- View from one of the various bridges on the Letort Spring Run Nature Trail
- Length: 2.0 miles
- Location: Carlisle, Pennsylvania
- Established: 1974
- Trailheads: Letort Spring Run Park, South Spring Garden Street
- Use: Hiking, biking, walking, fishing
- Difficulty: Easy, level, ADA accessible
- Season: Year-round
- Sights: Benches, Picnic Areas, Rest Areas, Community Garden
- Hazards: Near water
- Surface: Cinder, Dirt, Grass, and Paved Path
- Right of way: old South Mountain Railroad

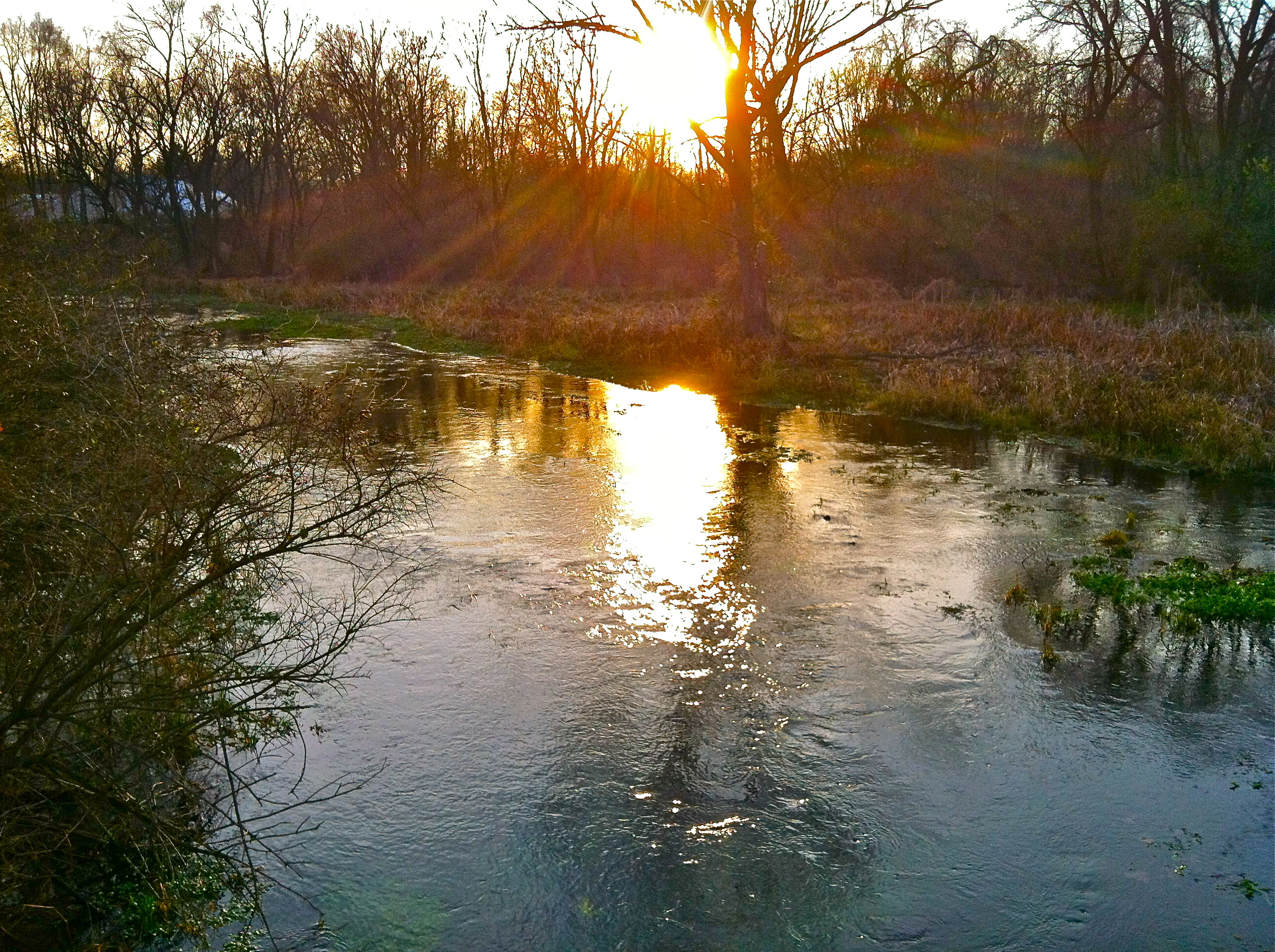
Letort Run stream

The Letort Spring Run Nature Trail (LSRNT) is a rail trail in Carlisle, Pennsylvania. The trail stretches between Carlisle Borough's Letort Park and a trailhead approximately 2 miles (3.2 km) south at South Spring Garden Street. It parallels and twice crosses the Letort Spring Run, a limestone stream nationally recognized for its role in fly fishing heritage. The trail is an expression of the Letort Regional Authority's mission to promote appreciation of the Letort, as well as to protect the stream, greenway, and watershed from degradation.

The trail begins at Letort Park, which has two baseball fields, a "Fort Letort" playground, and a tennis court. Because homes have been built adjacent to the stream, a segment of trail departs from the stream and former railbed to follow roads between the park and Lamberton Middle School. This section of the trail is approximately 8,757 ft of gravel path with beautiful overhanging trees throughout it, which concludes the trail at Spring Garden Street. The trail is supported by numerous organizations in the local Carlisle area and surrounding area of Pennsylvania.

== Historical development ==
=== Historical significance ===
Before 1720, James Le Tort, a French-Canadian interpreter and trader who occasionally worked as a government agent, built a cabin and trading post at the headwaters of the Letort, becoming the first European colonist to settle in the region. Shortly after 1720, the Le Tort family was pushed out of the area by a wave of Scots-Irish settlers and squatters.

During the Civil War, the Confederate infantry division of General Robert E. Rodes camped along the spring at Bonny Brook on Saturday June 27, 1863 and stayed there until the night of June 29, when they made way towards Gettysburg through Mt. Holly Springs.

On Wednesday July 1, Union General William "Baldy" Smith also made use of the run as a short station while his militiamen made way towards Carlisle where they confronted Confederate General Stuart's cavalry. Stuart ordered the shelling of Carlisle and razed the US Army Barracks located there before his forces disengaged to join the second day of battle in Gettysburg.

=== Trail’s History and Evolution ===
The current hiking trail follows the old bed of the South Mountain Railroad. The South Mountain Railroad was constructed in 1869 and was completed in 1870. The route began at Pine Grove Furnace and passed through Laurel Forge, Mt. Holly, Mt. Holly Springs, across the Yellow Breeches, to Bonny Brook, to the LeTort and then finally into Carlisle. The South Mountain Railroad joins with the Cumberland Valley Railroad and was mostly used to transport ore from Pine Grove to Harrisburg. The South Mountain Railroad is near where Southside Deli is located, where York Rd. branches off from High St. about 1/2 mile east of downtown Carlisle.

== Trail development ==
=== Design and Construction ===
In 1973, local citizens came together to discuss ways to preserve the LeTort Spring Run as a community resource. These meetings early on helped to form the LeTort Regional Authority in 1974. The Authority is backed by numerous local governmental agencies. The goal of the Letort Regional Authority is to protect and preserve the LeTort Spring Run and its watershed by promoting flood control and developing access and recreational opportunities within the watershed.

Since 1974, the trail has had both one-time and long-term projects that aim to clean the watersheds. Some of the projects include:

- Stream Restorations
- Easements
- Annual Clean-Up days
- Monitoring and Testing
- Project Review
- Nature Trail
- Regulatory Designations and Zoning

Trail Amenities

Facilities include restrooms (ADA accessible), picnic areas, and benches all located at LeTort Park.

LeTort is also known for being a pristine fly-fishing area in accordance with Pennsylvania Fish & Boat Commission regulations. It is also recognized as one of the best trout fishing areas in the country. The spring states that all fish must be released back into the stream. The largest fish caught there was twenty-nine and one-half inches and 10 pound and 4 ounces. The fish was caught by Terry Ward.

LeTort is a highly supported community resource, it has become a living classroom for children and other local governments. Students, scouts, adults and local youth governments work side by side to assist various projects and learn about the watershed. At the entrance by Noble Blvd, there is a community garden that is planted and maintained by the students at the Lambert Middle School.

== Community ==
=== Trail Supporters ===
Supporters of the LeTort trail vary greatly; from local businesses, non-profit, and schools and churches. All take part in helping to preserve the trail and its watersheds. Dickinson College has groups of students and faculty that often come to monitor and educate the young student about the importance of keeping the watersheds clean. The LeTort Regional Authority is responsible for the promotion of funding for the up keep of the trail and the cleanliness of the watershed. Some of the local businesses, non-profits and organizations that work with or serve the LeTort Spring Run Nature Trail are:

- LeTort Regional Authority, Pennsylvania
- Cumberland County Conservation District, Pennsylvania
- Carlisle Chamber of Commerce, Pennsylvania
- Central Pennsylvania Conservancy
- Alliance for the Chesapeake Bay, Maryland
- Cumberland Valley Rail Trail Council
- Dickinson College
- South Middleton Township
- Cumberland County Planning Commission

=== Special events ===
There are no major special events that are planned here yearly. However, Carlisle Area Health and Wellness Foundation promote Simply Moving. Simply Moving was created to spread awareness of being physically active at all ages. There are also numerous visits by local schools and organizations to promote the conservancy of the trail.
