= Chartiers Run (Allegheny River tributary) =

Location
- Country: United States

Physical characteristics
- Source
  - coordinates: 40.5755556°N 79.6747222°W
- Mouth
  - coordinates: 40.6045108°N 79.7247701°W
  - elevation: 768 feet (234 m)

Basin features
- River system: Allegheny River

Chartiers Run is a tributary of the Allegheny River located in Westmoreland County in the U.S. state of Pennsylvania. It was named after Peter Chartier, a trapper of French and Native American parentage who established a trading post at the mouth of Chartiers Creek in 1743.

== Course ==
Chartiers Run joins the Allegheny River at the city of Lower Burrell.

== See also ==
- List of rivers of Pennsylvania
- List of tributaries of the Allegheny River
