= Martin Chartier =

French–Canadian explorer, fur trader and frontiersman (1655–1718)

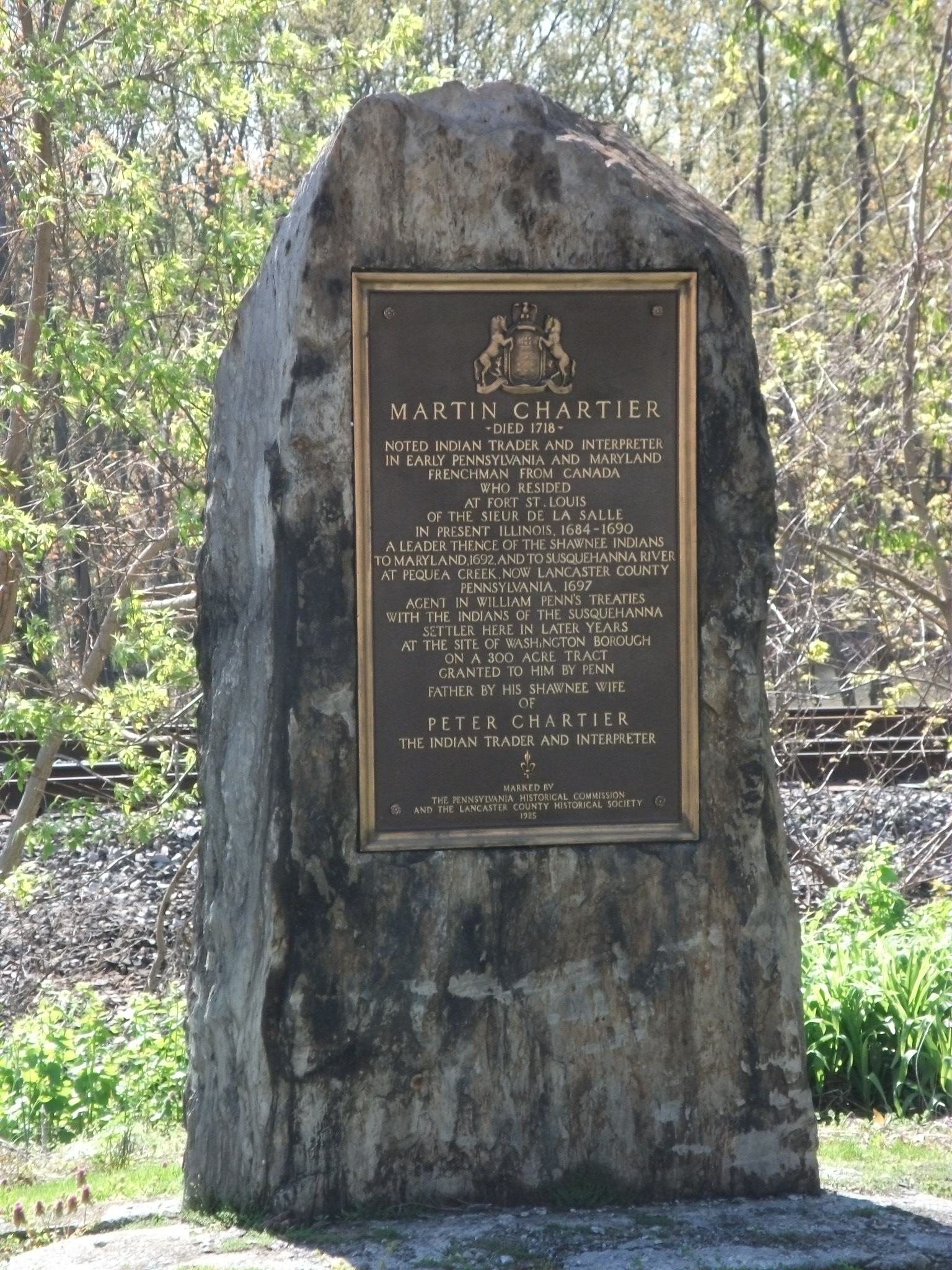
- Historical marker, erected in 1925, in Washington Boro, Pennsylvania, commemorating the life of Martin Chartier
- Born: 1655; St-Jean-de-Montierneuf, Poitiers, Vienne, Poitou-Charentes, France
- Died: 1718 (aged 62–63); Washington Boro, Pennsylvania
- Occupations: Explorer, fur trader, glovemaker
- Known for: Travels with Louis Jolliet and René-Robert Cavelier, Sieur de La Salle
- Spouse: Sewatha Straight Tail (1660–1759)
- Parent(s): René Chartier (1621–1689); Madeleine Ranger (1621?–1662)
- Relatives: Children: Mary Seaworth (Sewatha) Chartier (1687–1732); Peter Chartier (1690–1759)

Martin Chartier (French pronunciation: [maʁtɛ̃ ʃaʁtje]; 1655 – Apr 1718) was a French-Canadian explorer and trader, carpenter and glove maker. He lived much of his life amongst the Shawnee Native Americans in what is now the United States.

Chartier accompanied Louis Jolliet on two of his journeys to the Illinois Country of New France, and went with René-Robert Cavelier, Sieur de La Salle on his 1679–80 journey to Lake Erie, Lake Huron, and Lake Michigan. Chartier assisted in the construction of Fort Miami and Fort Crèvecoeur. On April 16, 1680, Chartier, together with six other men, mutinied, looted, burned Fort Crèvecoeur, and fled.

In a letter dated 1682, La Salle stated that Martin Chartier "was one of these who incited the others to do as they did."

Chartier sometimes was written as Chartiere, Chartiers, Shartee or Shortive.

== Early life ==
Martin Chartier was born in 1655 in St-Jean-de-Montierneuf, Poitiers, Poitou, France. In 1667, when he was twelve, his family emigrated from France to New France, including his father René, brother Pierre, and sister Jeanne Renée. They joined his paternal grandfather and uncle there.

On the transatlantic voyage, Chartier and his father René became acquainted with René-Robert Cavelier, Sieur de La Salle, who was also immigrating to Canada. Some sources state that the young Chartier spent the next several years in Montreal learning to make gloves, (Note: Evidence that Chartier was a glovemaker is very tenuous, but has become a traditional part of his biography. Other evidence suggests that from 1667 to 1669, he was apprenticed to a house carpenter, a skill that would have made him useful on Jolliet's and La Salle's expeditions.) but there is also evidence that he was apprenticed to a carpenter.

Chartier's father, uncle and grandfather were killed in the Lachine massacre outside Montreal on August 5, 1689.

== Louis Jolliet's 1672–74 expedition ==
In 1672, Martin Chartier and his brother Pierre took part in Louis Jolliet's second expedition. In December 1672 Jolliett and his company reached the Straits of Mackinac, where he met up with Pierre Marquette. They talked with native people and prepared maps for the 1673 expedition to find the mouth of the Mississippi River; a voyage that would become famous. They wanted to discover whether it flowed into the Gulf of Mexico or the Pacific Ocean.

In 1674, Chartier accompanied Louis Jolliet to the Illinois Country, where he became acquainted with the Pekowi Shawnee, who lived at that time on the Wabash River. (Note: The subgroup of the Shawnee that Chartier lived with is referred to in some sources as the "Stabbernowles," but this may be an alternate designation for the Pekowi.) After Jolliet returned to Quebec in 1675, Chartier returned to the territory and married Sewatha Straight Tail (1660–1759), daughter of the Shawnee chief Straight Tail Meaurroway Opessa. Their first child, a daughter, was born in 1676, according to a 1692 statement by Chartier.

== La Salle's 1679 expedition ==
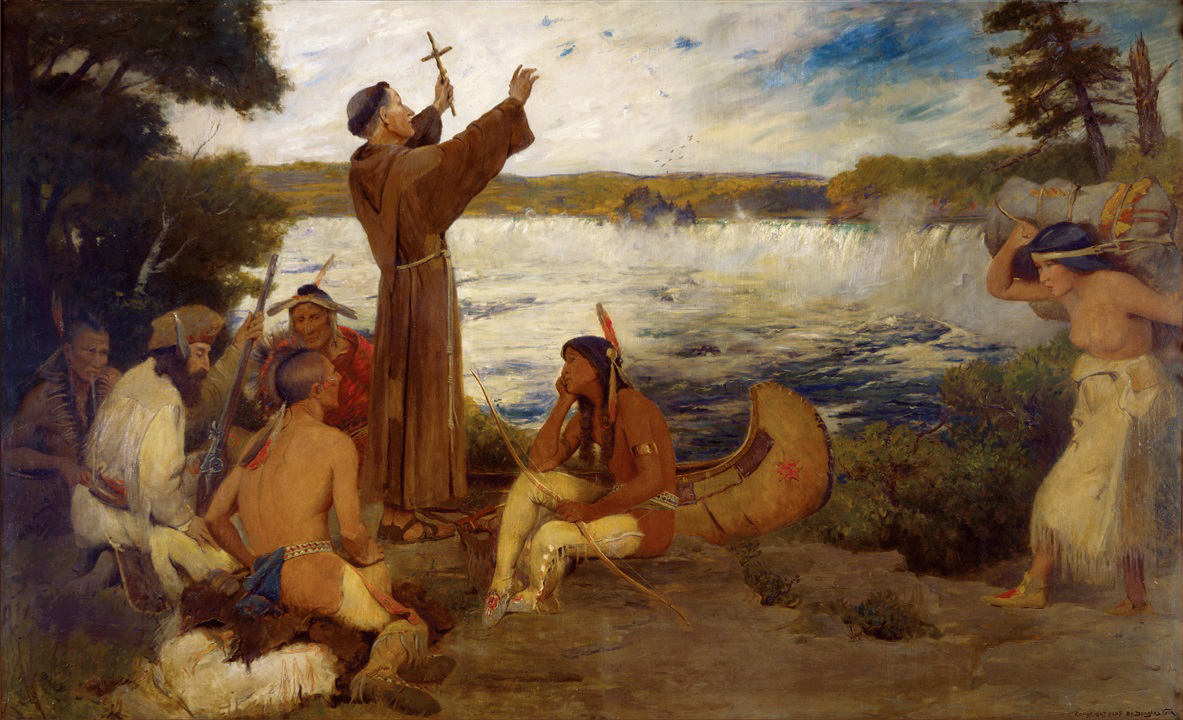
Painting by Douglas Volk, of Father Louis Hennepin discovering Saint Anthony Falls.

Chartier went with René-Robert Cavelier, Sieur de La Salle on his 1679–1680 journey to Lake Erie, Lake Huron, and Lake Michigan. They were accompanied by Belgian missionary Louis Hennepin and French missionary Zenobius Membre.

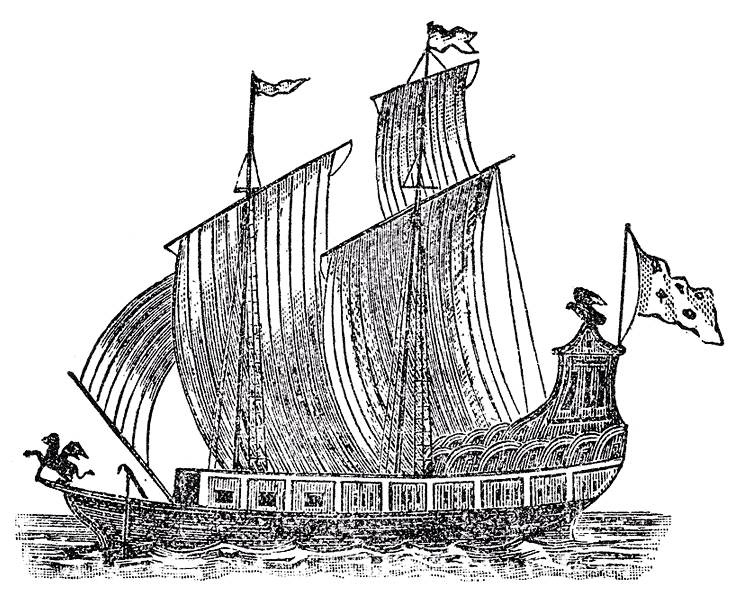
Woodcut of the Griffon

Chartier assisted in the construction of Le Griffon, a seven-cannon, 45-ton barque, on the upper Niagara River at or near Cayuga Creek. She was launched on August 7, 1679, and was the largest sailing vessel on the Great Lakes up to that time. La Salle sailed in Le Griffon up Lake Erie to Lake Huron, then up to Michilimackinac and on to present-day Green Bay, Wisconsin. Le Griffon left for Niagara with a load of furs, but was never seen again. La Salle continued with his men in canoes down the western shore of Lake Michigan, rounding the southern end to the mouth of the St. Joseph River, where Chartier helped to build a stockade in November 1679. They called it Fort Miami (now known as St. Joseph, Michigan). There they waited for Henri de Tonti and his party, who had crossed the Lower Peninsula of Michigan on foot.

Tonti arrived on November 20; on December 3, the entire party set off up the St. Joseph, which they followed until they had to take a portage at present-day South Bend, Indiana. They crossed to the Kankakee River and followed it to the Illinois River, where they started construction on Fort Crèvecoeur on January 15, 1680. Father Hennepin went with a small party to seek the junction of the St. Joseph and the Mississippi rivers; he was captured by Sioux warriors and held for several months.

=== The 1680 mutiny at Fort Crèvecoeur ===
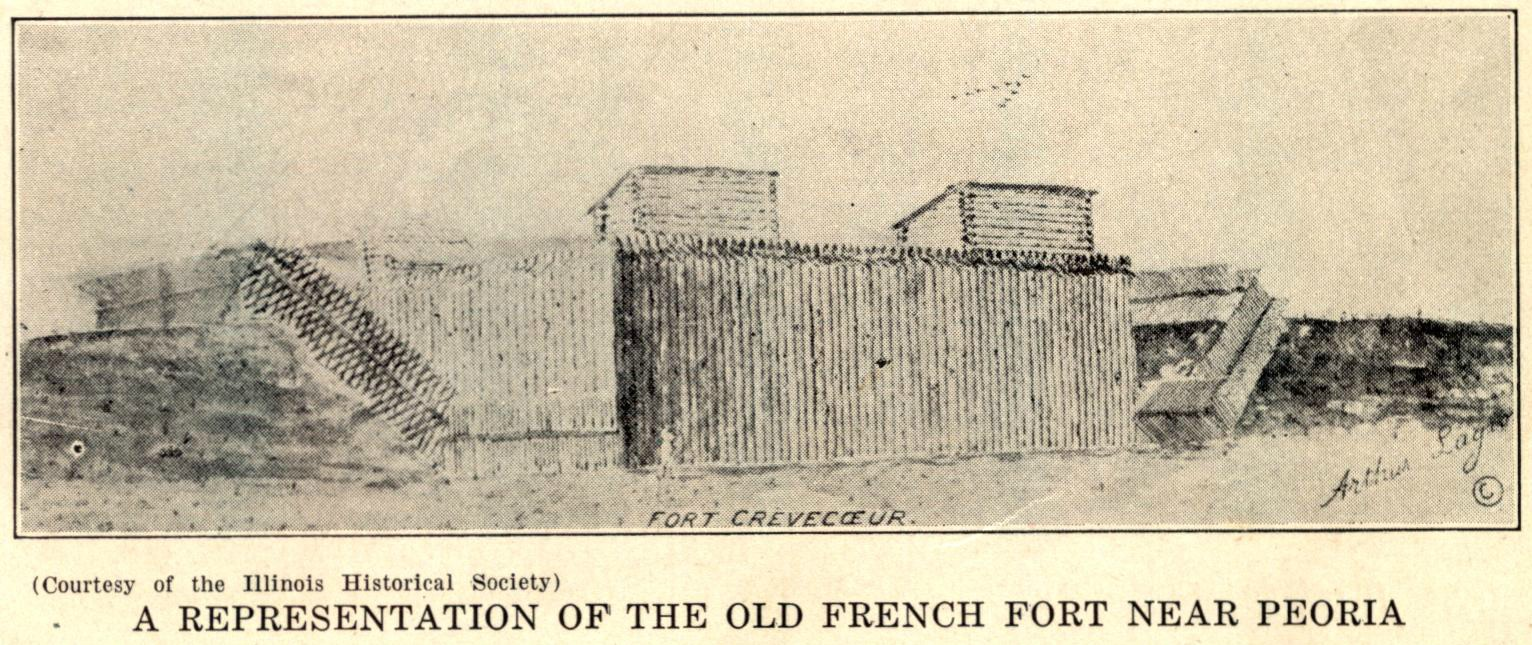
Fort Crèvecoeur

Chartier assisted in the construction of Fort Crèvecoeur, which was built along the Illinois River near the present-day site of Peoria, Illinois. The fort was the first public building erected by white men within the boundaries of the modern state of Illinois, and the first fort built in the West by the French. La Salle also started building another 40-ton barque to replace Le Griffon. On March 1, 1680, La Salle set off on foot for Fort Frontenac for supplies, leaving Henri de Tonti to hold Fort Crèvecoeur in Illinois. On his return trip up the Illinois River, La Salle concluded that Starved Rock might provide an ideal location for another fortification and sent word downriver to Tonti regarding this idea. Following La Salle's instructions, Tonti took five men and traveled upriver to assess the suitability of the Starved Rock site. Shortly after Tonti's departure, on April 16, 1680, the seven members of the expedition who remained at Fort Crevecoeur mutinied, plundering the provisions and ammunition, throwing into the river all the arms, goods, and stores which they could not carry off, and burning the fort to the ground. In a letter dated 1682, La Salle blamed Chartier as one of the main instigators "who incited the others to do as they did."

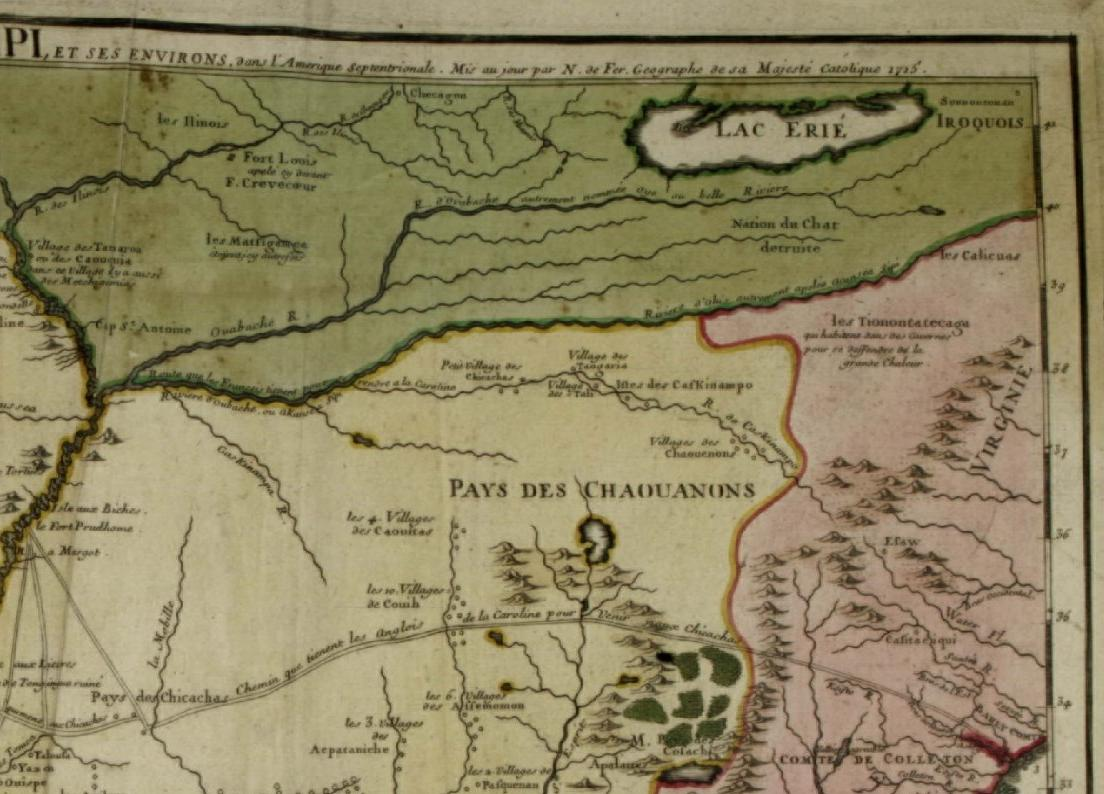
1715 map showing Fort Crèvecoeur (upper left) and the land of the "Chaouanons" (Shawnee)

The mutiny was probably caused by the men's fear of being killed by Haudenosaunee raiding parties, who were devastating the local Illinois communities at the height of the Beaver Wars. The men were demanding that La Salle return with them to Montreal, which he was unwilling to do. In addition, one of the mutineers who was later captured, the shipbuilder Moyse Hillaret, testified that "some [of the men] had had no pay for three years," and alleged that La Salle had mistreated them.

In a deposition made before the Sieur du Chesneau, Intendant of New France, dated 17 August 1680, Hillaret stated the mutineers were dissatisfied "because the said Sieur de La Salle wanted them to build sleighs to draw his goods and personal effects as far as the village of the Illinois [the site of the proposed Fort St. Louis (Starved Rock)]."

At Fort St. Louis two men who had been at the fort told Tonti of its destruction. Tonti sent messengers to La Salle in Canada to report the events. Tonti then returned to Fort Crèvecoeur to collect any tools not destroyed and moved them to the Kaskaskia Village at Starved Rock. Later La Salle captured a few of the mutineers on Lake Ontario, but not Chartier, who followed the south shore of Lake Ontario headed for upstate New York, as a part of a second group of eight deserters, while the others, who were eventually captured, were pursuing La Salle, intending to kill him. Chartier testified in a deposition in 1692 that he went to Esopus, New York, however he may have meant that he took refuge among the Esopus people, a subgroup of the Lenape living along the Hudson River. Louis-Henri de Baugy, Chevalier de Baugy later testified that Chartier may have stayed with Shawnees in the area of Starved Rock for one or two years before returning to Montreal.

== Life with the Shawnee ==
After the mutiny at Fort Crèvecoeur, Chartier was classified as an outlaw. But he apparently returned to Montreal, from where he journeyed in 1685 to Lake Michigan, then to the Cumberland River in Tennessee, evidently in search of his wife and adolescent daughter:

In August, he resolved to follow [the Shawnees], and took a canoe and went after them three hundred leagues (about 900 miles) in forty days ... He guessed the way, and was guided by the course of the river, and found water in all places ... And when he came to them [the Shawnee] they made him very welcome...and invited [him] to come and live among them.

After reuniting with his family, he visited the future site of Pittsburgh, Pennsylvania, then crossed the Allegheny Mountains with them and traveled along the Susquehanna River. His second daughter Mary Seaworth (Sewatha) Chartier (1687–1732) was born in Frederick County, Virginia in 1687.

=== Birth of Peter Chartier ===
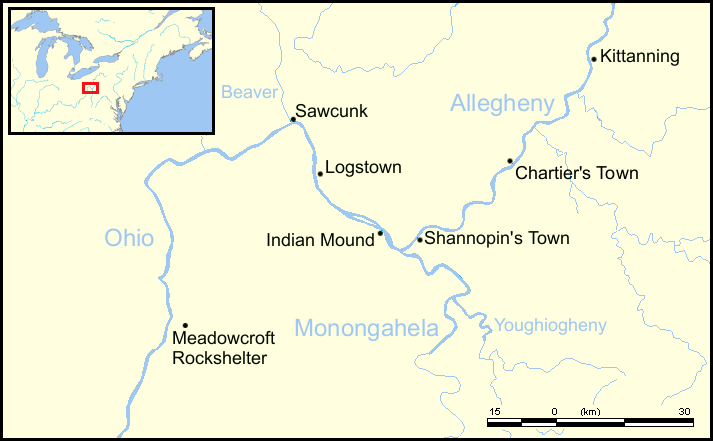
Chartier's (Old) Town on a 1921 map showing Native American communities in southwestern Pennsylvania.

In 1689, Chartier established a trading post at French Lick on the Cumberland River in Middle Tennessee, near what developed as the present-day site of Nashville, Tennessee. His son Peter (Pierre) Chartier was born here in 1690.

Peter Chartier later became a leader of the Pekowi Shawnee and campaigned against the sale of alcohol in indigenous communities in Pennsylvania.

After Peter's birth, Martin and his Shawnee family established a fur trading post at the confluence of the Monongahela River and the Allegheny River, the present-day site of Pittsburgh. The Ohio River begins here. They resided there for two years.

=== Relocation to Maryland and Pennsylvania ===
In spring 1692, Chartier led a group of 192 Shawnee and an unknown number of Susquehannock (Conestoga) Indians east to Frederick County, Maryland on the Potomac River. The Shawnee were relocating after a series of violent conflicts with Illinois and Miami Indians. The Susquehannock, having recently been defeated by the Haudenosaunee nations based in what became New York, formed an alliance with the Shawnee. With the help of Chartier, they intended to use the Susquehanna River to transport furs for the growing North American Fur Trade. Although French by birth, Chartier wanted to exploit the rivalry between the French and English to benefit his Shawnee family.

Suspecting that Chartier was employed by the French, English colonial officials in Annapolis ordered Chartier's arrest. He was jailed in St. Mary's and Anne Arundel counties as "a spy or party with designs of mischief." He was released to await trial but he escaped; he was recaptured in August 1692 and sentenced to three months in prison. (Note: During his deposition before the court, Chartier (who is also referred to as "Martin Shortive") was identified by the tattoo "MC" on his chest, and said that he had two Native American wives and a daughter, aged 16.) He was released on October 29, 1692.

In defense of Chartier, Casperus Augustine Herman, son of Augustine Herman and Lord of Bohemia Manor in Maryland, wrote to Governor Lionel Copley on February 15, 1693, that Martin Chartier was "a man of excellent parts", saying that he spoke several languages and had been apprenticed to a carpenter as a young man. Chartier and his family spent 1693 "residing upon...Bohemia Manor, on the south bank of the lower Elk River" in Maryland.

Feeling unwelcome, Chartier and his band of Shawnee moved north into Pennsylvania in 1694, settling in what became known as Chartier's Old Town (later Tarentum, Pennsylvania). He maintained a good relationship with the Provincial Government, and at times served as an interpreter and unofficial liaison between the government and the Indians.

By the late 1690s the Canadian fur trade network had become so well-developed that there was a glut of furs reaching Quebec, leading to a drop in prices. For a few years Chartier and his French-Canadian friends Peter Bisaillon and Jacques Le Tort ran a smuggling operation, bringing furs from Detroit to Albany and Pennsylvania, where the English paid a higher price for them.

=== The Chartier and Conestoga alliance ===
In 1701, Chartier and his Shawnee community invited the Conestoga to live with them, after they were decimated by war and a major infectious epidemic. Both the Conestoga and the Shawnee appeared before William Penn and on 23 April 1701 they were granted formal permission for this arrangement. They established the community of Conestoga Town near Manor Township, Lancaster County, Pennsylvania. At a time of frontier violence, the descendants of these Indians were killed by the Paxton Boys in December 1763.

== French traders in Pennsylvania ==
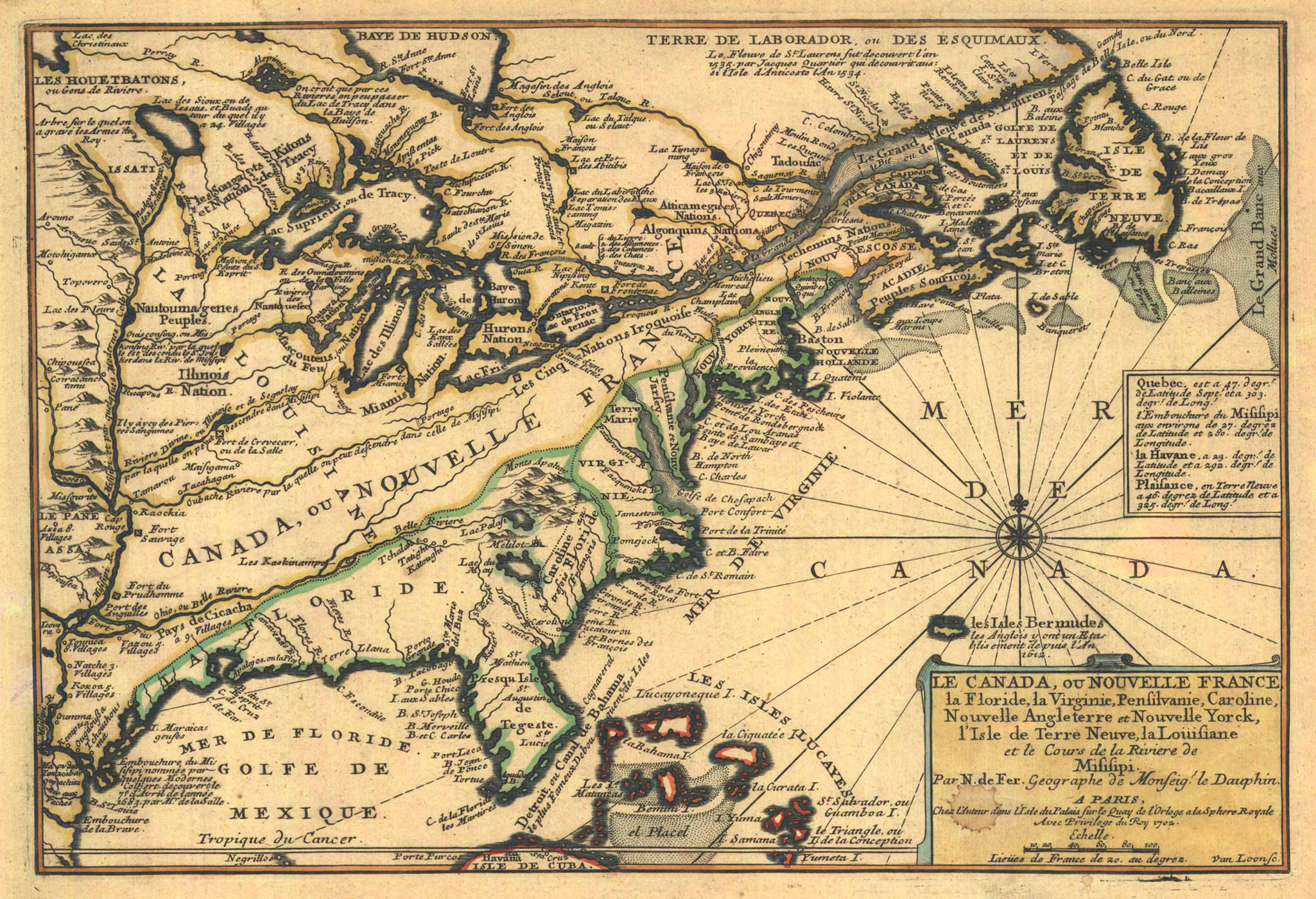
Map of New France in 1703, which included most of Pennsylvania.

By the late 17th century, French settlers and fur traders were moving into the Ohio Valley (then part of New France) to take advantage of the opportunities for commerce among various Native American tribes concentrated there. Some had been pushed away from the east coast by the pressure of European colonization. Experienced in frontier life and fluent in several Native American languages, Chartier and his expedition colleagues, Peter Bisaillon, Nicole Godin, and Jacques Le Tort, his son James, and Le Tort's wife Anne Le Tort, were six of the most prominent coureurs des bois who established the earliest trading posts.

The colonial authorities of the Province of Pennsylvania suspected that they were "very dangerous persons" who "kept private correspondence with the Canada Indians and the French," and who "entertained strange Indians in remote and obscure places," and who "uttered suspicious words."

=== Arrest of Nicole Godin ===
Chartier escaped persecution only after agreeing to assist in the arrest of Nicole Godin. At that time, both French and British colonial governments were trying to influence Native American communities to take one side or the other, for trading relations as well as political control. Nicole Godin was an English trader born in London to a French father. After 1701 he operated a trading post near Chartier's homestead. He was suspected of "using endeavors to incense these people [the local Shawnees], to stir them up to enmity against the subjects of the Crown; and to join with our public enemy, the French, to our destruction."

On May 15, 1704, Chartier was summoned to Philadelphia and questioned by William Penn "in regard to his relations with the Indians, he being 'a Frenchman, who has lived long among the Shawanah Indians and upon Conestoga.'" Although there is no record of this interrogation, some of it likely pertained to Godin's activities. On 1 July 1707, Pennsylvania Governor John Evans persuaded Chartier to lure Godin into a trap near Paxtang, Pennsylvania, where Godin was arrested. Godin was tried for treason in Philadelphia in 1708, but the results of the trial are unknown. He died before 1712, when Anne Le Tort was named executrix of his estate.

== Later life ==
Chartier is known to have acted as interpreter for the Shawnee at conferences held with the British at Conestoga in 1711 and 1717. In 1717, Governor Penn granted Chartier a 300-acre tract of land (one source says 500 acres) along the Conestoga River in Lancaster County, Pennsylvania. He and his son Peter Chartier established a trading post near a Shawnee village on Pequea Creek in Pennsylvania. That same year, he accompanied Christoph von Graffenried, 1st Baron of Bernberg on a journey to Sugarloaf Mountain in Maryland. They traveled south to the Shenandoah Valley, where they visited Massanutten Mountain in a fruitless search for silver ore. This had reportedly been found several years earlier by Swiss explorer Franz Ludwig Michel.

== Death, burial and memorialization ==
Martin Chartier died in April, 1718, on his farm in Dekanoagah, Pennsylvania, near the Susquehanna River and northwest of Conestoga. His funeral on 25 April was attended by James Logan, the future Mayor of Philadelphia. Immediately after the funeral, Logan seized Chartier's 250-acre estate, on the grounds that the late explorer owed him a debt of 108 pounds, 19 shillings and 3 and 3/4 pence. Logan later sold the property to Stephen Atkinson for 30 pounds.

In 1873, Chartier's grave was accidentally discovered by John Stehman, who then owned the property. Chartier was evidently buried in traditional Shawnee style, with the addition of his helmet, a cutlass, and several small cannonballs.

A historical marker, erected in 1925 by the Lancaster County Historical Society, stands on the site of his burial, in Washington Boro, Pennsylvania, at the intersection of River Road and Charlestown Road.

== Legacy ==
Historian Stephen Warren says that Chartier played a crucial role in facilitating communications between the Shawnee and the French (and later British) colonists with whom they frequently interacted:

Chartier traded canoeing the interior of the continent for French explorers for a life as a partisan of a Shawnee band that refused to choose sides in imperial quests for power...The colonizers with whom he dealt always treated him with suspicion. But the Shawnees valued him because he effectively brought his knowledge of European colonizers to Shawnees struggling to make sense of these newcomers. Chartier became their cultural broker...For Shawnee migrants, proximity to colonizers was a matter of survival...The Shawnees ... modeled themselves after men such as Martin and Peter Chartier, who moved between regions and empires in a single lifetime. Like the Chartiers, the Shawnees refused to acquiesce to French, English, or Haudenosaunee "overlords." Frustratingly independent, Shawnee migrants made deliberate choices based on the realities of Indian slavery, intertribal warfare, and access to European trade goods.
