= Patrick Gordon (governor) =

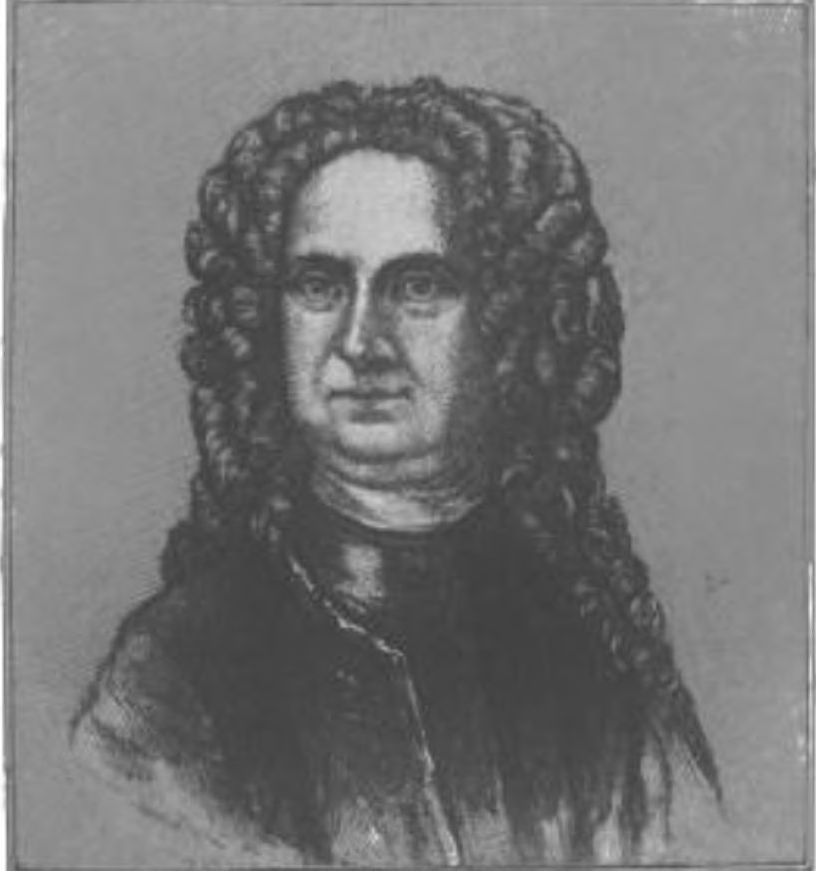
An early 18th century illustration of Gordon

Patrick Gordon (c. 1644 – August 17, 1736) was Deputy governor of the Province of Pennsylvania and the Lower Counties on the Delaware from 22 June 1726 to 4 August 1736. He was deputy to the Proprietors of Pennsylvania, the heirs of William Penn, rather than to a governor. Since the proprietors were usually in England, he was essentially the governor.

== Biography ==
Gordon had a military, rather than political background. He was a major in the regular army. He resided in what is present-day Mont Clare, Pennsylvania, and had at least seven children: Charles, Army, Archibal, Henrietta, Philadelphia, Elizabeth, and Agatha Harriot.

Peace and prosperity reportedly prevailed during Gordon's administration as deputy governor. In 1732, a lawsuit was settled that temporarily defined the boundaries between the colonial-era provinces of Pennsylvania and Maryland.

Chester County was also split during his term as governor, creating Lancaster County, and construction of the first State House, today's Independence Hall, began in 1732. Prior to 1735, members of the state Assembly met in private homes or at Quaker meeting houses.
