= Robert Quary =

English colonial governor

6th colonial governor of Proprietary Period of South Carolina
- In office July 12, 1685 – October 1685
- Monarch: James II & VII
- Preceded by: Joseph West
- Succeeded by: Joseph Morton

Member of the New Jersey Provincial Council Ex - Officio
- In office July 29, 1703 – October 1712

Personal details
- Born: c. 1644 England
- Died: October 1712 Virginia

Robert Quary (1644–1712) was a governor of the English proprietary Province of Carolina during 1685. He would later serve on the provincial councils of several other colonies.

== Career ==
In 1685, the Lords proprietors commissioned Quary as Provincial Secretary, and on July 12 he was appointed Governor of Carolina, replacing Joseph West. In October Quary was replaced by former Governor Joseph Morton.

Suspecting that Quary was using his position to encourage pirates, the proprietors removed him from all remaining positions in February 1688.

Seeking a political comeback, Quary supported Seth Sothel's takeover of the Governor's office in 1690, and was appointed Chief Justice. In 1692, Sothel was forced from office, and Quary fled South Carolina for Philadelphia, where he came under the protection of Maryland Gov. Francis Nicholson.

The Navigation Act of 1696 created admiralty courts, and Quary was appointed Judge of the Admiralty for the southern colonies, from Pennsylvania southward.

In 1701, Robert Quary was commissioned as Surveyor General of the Customs for New Jersey and Pennsylvania; in 1703 this appointment was expanded to include all of British America. In this position he served simultaneously on the Provincial Councils of five colonies: Maryland, New Jersey, New York, Pennsylvania, and Virginia.

Robert Quary died in Virginia in October 1712.
