= LeTort Spring Run =

River tributary in Pennsylvania, U.S.

Coordinates: 40.20521°N 77.18193°W

The LeTort Spring Run is a 9.4-mile-long (15.1 km) tributary of Conodoguinet Creek in Cumberland County, Pennsylvania in the United States.

Located near Carlisle, its length between Pennsylvania Route 34 and Conodoguinet Creek is a designated Pennsylvania Scenic River. It is a well-known fly fishing stream where anglers fish for brown trout, and is the namesake for the famous grashopper-imitating fly pattern, the LeTort Hopper. Located along its banks are LeTort Park, owned by the Borough of Carlisle, and the LeTort Spring Run Nature Trail.

It is named for the French-Canadian fur trader James Le Tort, who built a cabin in the area about 1720.

== See also ==
- List of rivers of Pennsylvania
