= Sir George Thomas, 1st Baronet =

English colonial administrator and baronet

Sir George Thomas, 1st Baronet (died 1774) was an English colonial government official, who served as Governor of the Leeward Islands.

Thomas was descended from John Winthrop. His paternal grandfather bought land on Antigua in the 1660s and Thomas was educated on the island. He entered the assembly in the British Leeward Islands around 21 years old in 1716 and was reelected for several more terms.

Thomas served as Deputy Governor of the Province of Pennsylvania between 1738 and 1747. In 1753 he became Captain General and Governor in Chief of the British Leeward Islands, serving in the position until 1766. In January of that year he suspended Arthur Freeman from His Majesty's Council of Antigua after he married Thomas' daughter without permission; Lieutenant-Colonel Josiah Martin was appointed to replace him. Upon his return to England, he was created a baronet, of Yapton in the County of Sussex in the Baronetage of Great Britain, on 6 September 1766.

He married Lydia, daughter of John King, Esq. of Antigua.

Sir George Thomas, 7th Baronet was the last of this lineage, who had no sons; this baronetcy terminated with his death in 1972.

Baronetage of Great Britain
New creation	Baronet (of Yapton); 1766–1774	Succeeded by William Thomas
