= Pennsylvania Provincial Council =

American council

Provincial Council of Pennsylvania

Type
- Type: Upper house

History
- Founded: 1682
- Disbanded: 1776
- Seats: 18-72

The Pennsylvania Provincial Council helped govern the Province of Pennsylvania from 1682 to 1776. The provincial council was based on the English parliamentary system and was analogous to the Upper House or House of Lords. From the Frame of Government of Pennsylvania of 1683, the provincial council consisted of 18 to 72 members from the province's counties. The council had the power to dismiss the General Assembly, rule in the absence of the Governor or Lieutenant Governor, create courts, and make judicial appointments.

== Meeting places ==
Before 1753, the Council and Assembly met at various places such as Quaker meeting houses or private residences in Philadelphia. In the first government meeting on October 28, 1682 took place in Chester, Pennsylvania. After 1753 the government met at what is now Independence Hall.

== See also ==
- Colonial government in America
- General Assembly of the Province of Pennsylvania
