= William Clapham =

American military officer

- Born: 1722; Boston, Massachusetts
- Died: 28 May 1763 (aged 40–41); West Newton, Pennsylvania
- Military career
- Allegiance: Kingdom of Great Britain: Massachusetts; Pennsylvania
- Branch: Massachusetts Militia; Pennsylvania Provincial Forces
- Service years: 1747–1757
- Rank: Colonel
- Units: Clapham's Rangers; Augusta Regiment
- Commands: Fort Hunter; Fort Halifax; Fort Augusta
- Conflicts: Father Le Loutre's War; Battle at St. Croix; Battle at Chignecto; Raid on Dartmouth (1751); French and Indian War

Colonel William Clapham (1722 – 28 May 1763) was an American military officer who served in Father Le Loutre's War and the French and Indian War. Clapham was considered a competent commander in engagements with French troops and Native American warriors, but towards the end of his military career he was unpopular with the soldiers under his command. Following his retirement from military service, Clapham and his family were killed by Lenape warriors on his farm in 1763.

== Early career and family ==
Nothing is known of William Clapham's early life. He was commissioned into the Massachusetts Militia at the rank of captain in Boston on 1 November 1747, and may have been born in Massachusetts.

He was married to Mary Clapham. He had one son, William Clapham, Jr., who served as a lieutenant in the Third Battalion, Pennsylvania Regiment of Foot after it was formed in late March, 1756, and who was killed by two Panis slaves in June 1762. Clapham also had a daughter Mary.

=== Defamation case, 1747 ===
Court records for Suffolk County, Massachusetts, show that on 30 June 1747, Clapham filed charges against William MacLanahan for defamation, claiming that MacLanahan

"did on ye fifteenth of June instant at Boston aforesd in ye hearing of Sundry persons willingly & malisciouly utter these false & scandalous Words, concerning ye Complainant, He (meaning the Complainant) is Lyar & a Cheat & has cheated his men (meaning the Soldiers under his Command) of their Provisions; He has used them cruelly & beat one them in such a manner as caused his Death."

The outcome of the case is not recorded.

== Service in Nova Scotia, 1748–1754 ==
In 1748, Clapham was sent as a company commander to defend Annapolis Royal as part of a wave of New England reinforcements destined for Nova Scotia, where he served with Jedidiah Preble and Benjamin Goldthwait.

Clapham was stationed in Nova Scotia during Father Le Loutre's War (1749–1755). On 19 August 1749, Clapham was in command at Canso, Nova Scotia, when Lieutenant Joseph Gorham and his party were attacked by Mi'kmaq who took twenty prisoners and carried them off to Louisbourg. After Governor Edward Cornwallis complained to the governor of Ile Royale, the prisoners were released.

After the 1749 raid on Dartmouth, Clapham raised a company of 70 men, known as "Clapham's Rangers," to fight the Mi'kmaq. Cornwallis offered £10 for every Mi'kmaq scalp or prisoner. The bounty of scalps was raised to £50 in 1750, motivating Clapham and Francis Bartelo to form new ranger companies to search the land around Halifax, Nova Scotia for Mi'kmaq. Clapham relieved John Gorham in the Battle at St. Croix on 23 March 1750, by arriving at Pisiguit with his company of rangers and two cannons, forcing the Mi'kmaq to withdraw. Clapham fought in the Battle at Chignecto on 3 September 1750. Although fighting continued across the Chignecto Isthmus during 1751, by summer Cornwallis had disbanded all ranger companies except Gorham's Rangers, a primarily Native American unit formed in 1744.

During the 1751 raid on Dartmouth (also referred to as the Dartmouth Massacre) on 13 May 1751, Miꞌkmaq warriors and Acadian militia under the command of Acadian Joseph Broussard, raided Dartmouth, Nova Scotia, destroying the town, killing twenty British colonists and wounding four soldiers. Clapham and 60 soldiers from the 45th Regiment of Foot were stationed on Blockhouse Hill. He and the company are reported to have remained within the blockhouse firing from the loopholes during the whole raid. A court-martial was called on 14 May, the day after the raid, to inquire into the conduct of the commanding officers who allowed the town to be destroyed. In June, Clapham's sergeant was acquitted.

=== Prosecution for homicide, 1751 ===
In 1751, Clapham was prosecuted in Halifax for killing a drunk prisoner of war by gagging him too tightly. The case was unique in that Clapham was not brought before a court martial, but was instead tried in a civilian court. The outcome of the case is not recorded.

== Divorce, 1754 ==
Following his service in Nova Scotia, Clapham returned to Boston to face divorce proceedings. Records for the Massachusetts House of Representatives for 17 October 1754, show a "special act" in the case of Mary Clapham v. William Clapham, sponsored in part by James Otis Sr., dissolving their marriage contract, after William Clapham stood convicted of "leaving the said Mary, cohabiting and committing Adultery with Another Woman in Nova Scotia." The act allowed Mary to marry again, and the council later awarded Mary her household furniture, worth £100.

== Promotion to colonel, 1756 ==
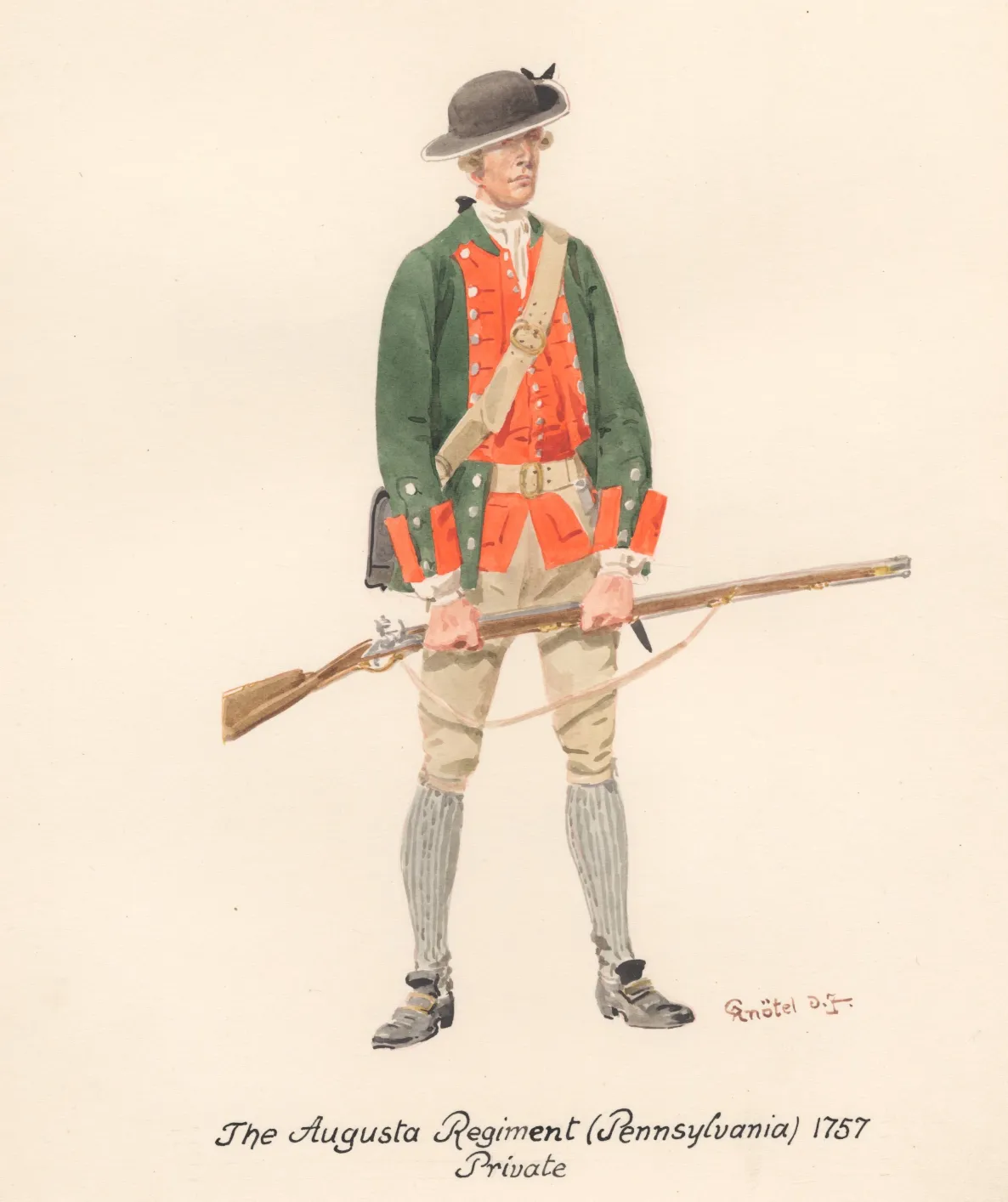
Illustration of an Augusta Regiment private in 1757

Clapham then moved to Pennsylvania to assist Benjamin Franklin in constructing a series of forts along the frontier. In late 1755, Governor Robert Hunter Morris ordered the construction of forts garrisoned with Pennsylvania militiamen, and plans were made to begin building Fort Hunter, Fort Halifax, and Fort Augusta. Following the Penn's Creek massacre, Great Cove massacre and Gnadenhütten massacre, Franklin had been charged with the rapid construction of three small forts in northeastern Pennsylvania (Fort Allen, Fort Franklin, and Fort Lebanon) but he felt that the responsibility for building forts should be given to someone with more military training, and offered a commission to Clapham, who accepted. Franklin writes in his autobiography:

"I had hardly finished this business and got my fort well stored with provisions, when I received a letter from the Governor...and my three intended forts being now completed, and the inhabitants contented to remain on their farms under that protection, I resolved to return; the more willingly as a New England Officer, Col. Clapham, experienced in Indian War, being on a visit to our establishment, consented to accept the Command. I gave him a commission, and, parading the garrison, had it read before them, and introduced him to them as an officer who, from his skill in military affairs, was much more fit to command them than myself."

Clapham was commissioned into the Pennsylvania Provincial Forces at the rank of colonel in February 1756, and given command over the Augusta Regiment as well as defenses in Northampton County.

== Fort Hunter ==
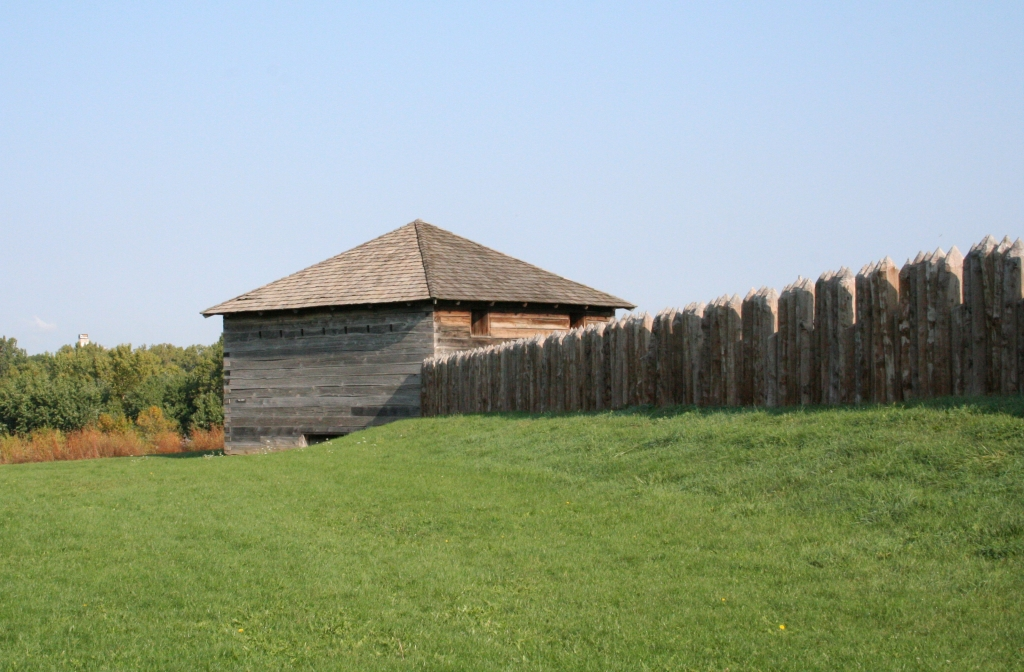
Reconstructed blockhouse and stockade similar in appearance to the one at Fort Hunter.

The Pennsylvania colonial government decided to construct a fort at Hunter's Mill in response to the Penn's Creek massacre in October 1755. The mill was located about six miles north of Harris' Ferry, probably five hundred feet east of the mouth of Fishing Creek, near its confluence with the Susquehanna River, in present-day Dauphin County. Fort Hunter was initially a stockaded gristmill in the Great Valley, owned by Samuel Hunter who lived on Fishing Creek. The mill was fortified with a simple stockade in January, 1756, and garrisoned with volunteer militia recruited by Thomas McKee, an Indian trader who operated a trading post nearby. He was appointed captain of "McKee's Volunteers," but provisions, clothing and ammunition were in short supply, and the post was vulnerable to attack.

On 8 March 1756, Franklin wrote to August Gottlieb Spangenberg that:

"We are apt to think, that the Guarrison in the Forts, after being a little more used to the Woods, and acquainted with the cunning Contrivances of the Savages, will be more diligent and successful, in ranging of the Woods; especially if Col. Clapham, who is reckond a very vigilant Gentleman, should soon come up again."

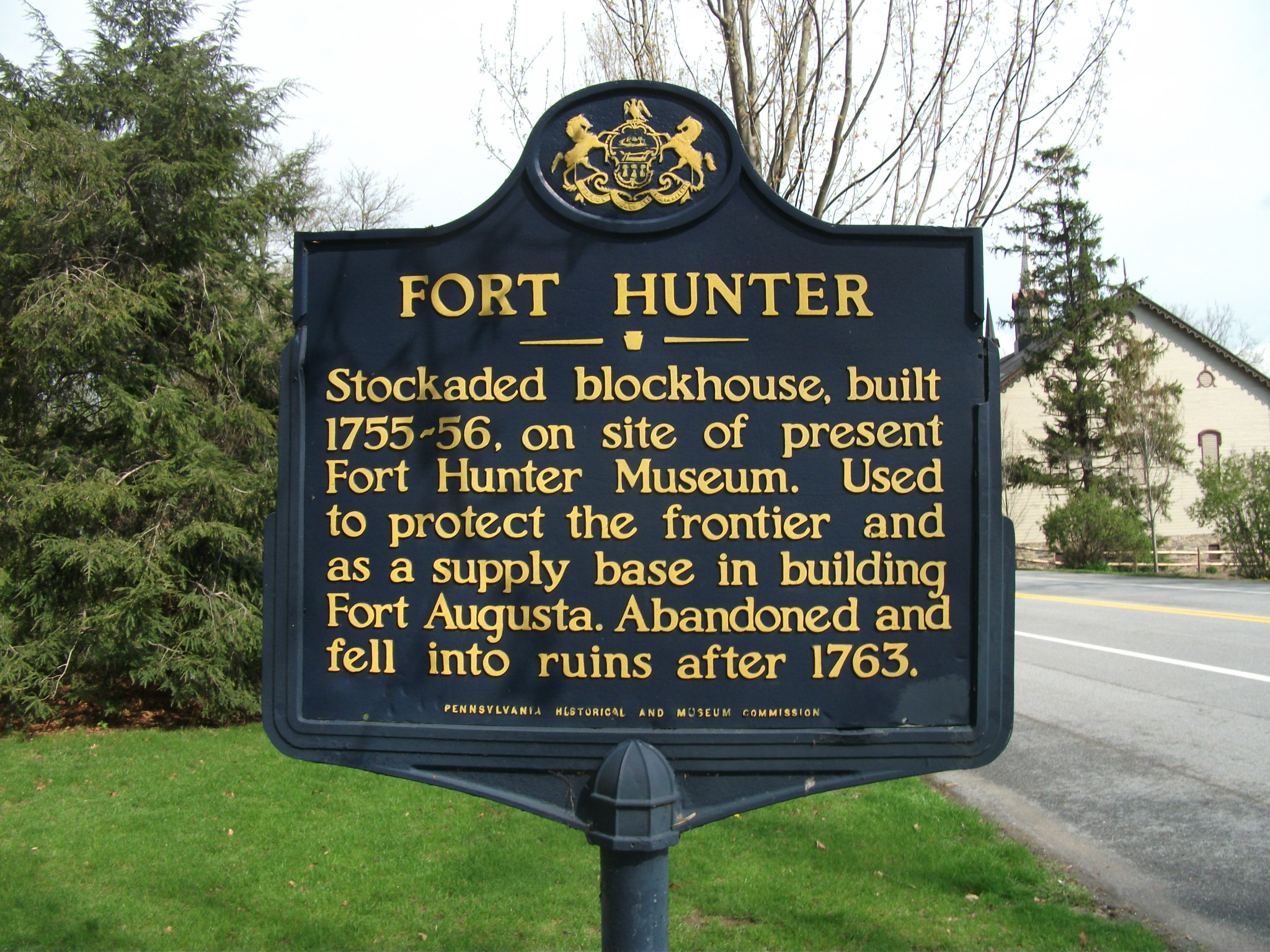
Historical marker on the site of Fort Hunter.

On 7 April 1756, Morris ordered Clapham to march his regiment to Hunter's Mill to begin construction. On 11 May 1756, McKee handed over command of the fort to Clapham. The fort probably consisted of a block house surrounded by a defensive ditch. There are references in historic documents to a stockade and to the construction (in January, 1757) of "a Room for the Officers & Barracks for the Soldiers...in Hunters Fort." It was described as having "a commanding view of the river." Fort Halifax was 160 feet wide with bastions, so Fort Hunter was likely similar in construction, but no drawings or plans exist.

In March 1757, Deputy Governor William Denny met with Lord Loudoun, Conrad Weiser, and Clapham and determined that Fort Hunter should be demolished. Its garrison and supplies were to be divided between Fort Augusta and Fort Halifax. In July and August, settlers in the area protested that removing the fort would put their homes in danger, and after several months of consideration, the governor instead decided to demolish Fort Halifax and transfer its garrison to Fort Hunter, strengthening it from 40 men to 80 men.

The fort was abandoned after the end of Pontiac's War in 1763 and fell into ruins. The community of Fort Hunter, Pennsylvania was established nearby after 1787.

=== Dispute with Governor Morris ===
Clapham's temperament was revealed in May, 1756, when he and several officers stayed with Governor Robert Morris at Harris's Ferry, operated by John Harris Sr. and the future site of Harrisburg, Pennsylvania. Captain Joseph Shippen later wrote to his father that Governor Morris had made some remarks which offended Clapham, so that Clapham refused to speak to the governor for several days afterward, and eventually saddled his horse with intent to ride away and abandon his troops. Captain Shippen and other officers persuaded Clapham not to leave, and were able to mediate a reconciliation between the two men. Historian William Albert Hunter comments on this event that:

"The Colonel [Clapham] was an obvious target for criticism; a New Englander, self-important in manner, somewhat arbitrary in action, sometimes intemperate in speech, he easily found adversaries who preferred to regard him as a person of limited accomplishments who had risen above his proper station."

== Fort Halifax ==
On 5 June 1756, Clapham left Fort Hunter with five companies (400 men), marching north along the Susquehanna River to select a suitable location for Fort Halifax. Clapham and his men marched from Harris's Ferry (present-day Harrisburg, Pennsylvania), while 18 bateaux and canoes loaded with materials traveled down the Susquehanna River, arriving on 11 June to start construction. Clapham picked a site near a large stand of pines which he planned to use for construction, close to a water-powered sawmill on Armstrong Creek. In a June 11 letter to Governor Morris, Clapham noted that the site he chose for the fort was appropriate because of "...the vast Plenty of Pine Timber at Hand, its nearness to Shamokin and a Saw within a Quarter of a Mile." In later correspondence he mentions the complete absence of roads along the river. The Lenape village of Shamokin had been abandoned a few weeks earlier.

On 10 June, Clapham held a conference with Oghaghradisha, an Iroquois chief, at Clapham's military camp. Oghaghradisha presented Clapham with a wampum belt and gave Clapham the Iroquois name "Ugcarumhiunth." He told Clapham that

"The Iroquois living on the North Branch of Sasquehanna have lent me as a representative of the whole, to treat with you and will ratify all my contracts. Brother, they agree to your building a Fort at Shamokin, but are desirous that you should also build a Fort three days' journey, in a canoe, higher up the North Branch, in their country, at a place called "Adjouquay" (present-day Pittston, Pennsylvania). If you agree to my proposals on behalf of my nation, I will return and immediately collect our whole force to be employed in protecting your people while you are building a fort in our country...The land is troubled, and you may justly apprehend danger, but if you will grant our request we will be together, and if any danger happens to you, we will share it with you."

Fort Halifax was a stockade fort 160 feet (49 m) square, with four bastions and surrounding earthworks about 10 feet high. Once finished, it was garrisoned by Pennsylvania Colonial Militia and served as the chief supply post between the area settlements and Shamokin where Fort Augusta would be built later that summer.

The fort was abandoned in late 1757, and was dismantled in mid-1763.

== Fort Augusta ==
=== Construction ===
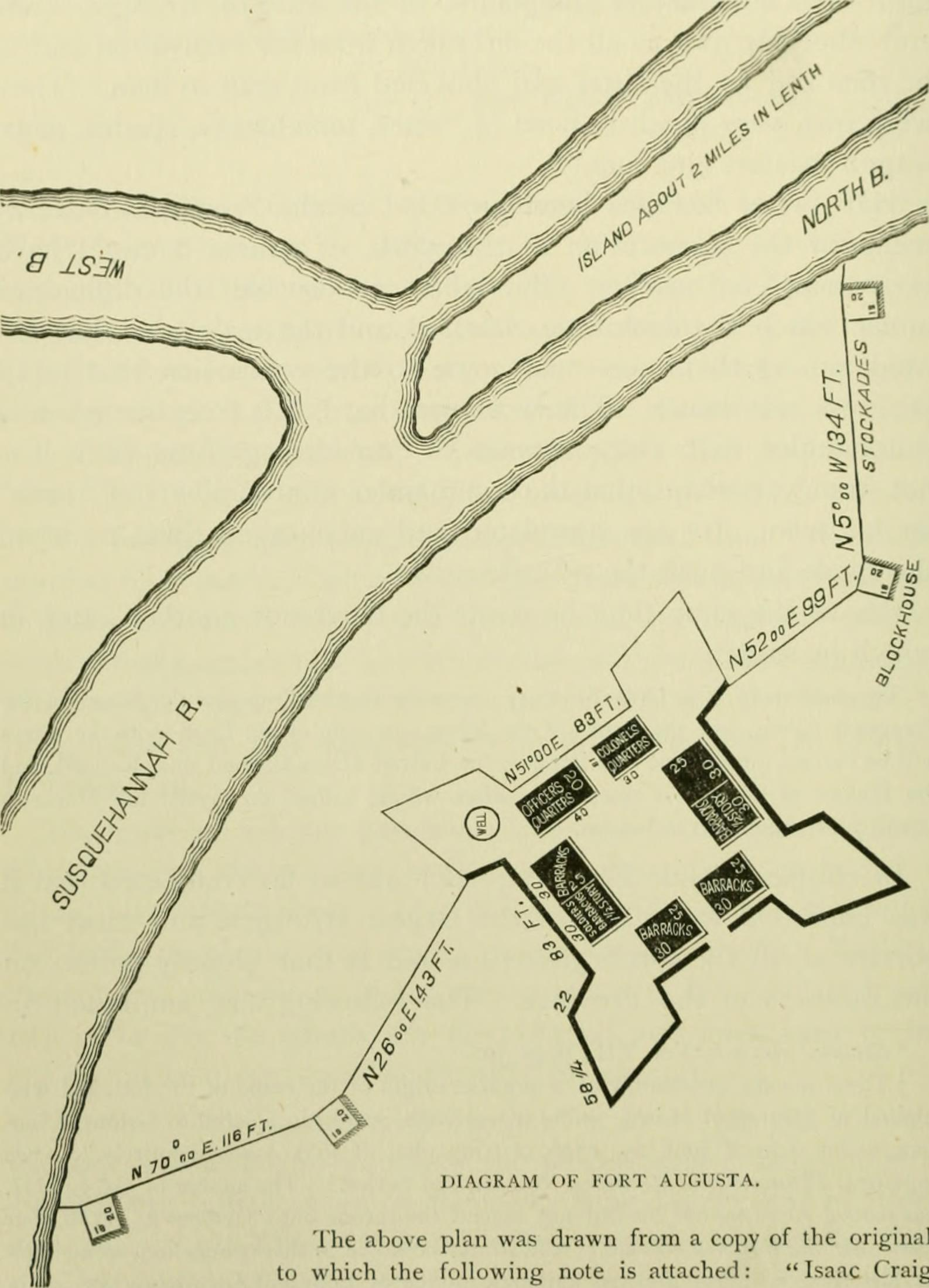
Plan of Fort Augusta on the east bank of the Susquehanna River as it was laid out on June 25, 1756 at the former location of Shamokin.

In June, 1756, Major James Burd finally received sufficient funding and supplies to begin building Fort Augusta at the former site of the Native American village of Shamokin. The fort was positioned so as to prevent Native American war parties from descending the Susquehanna River, to serve as a refuge for civilians under attack, and as a staging area for military expeditions against enemy forces. The plan of the fort had been previously drawn up by Governor Morris, who wrote to Clapham on 12 June recommending "a square with one ravelin to protect the curtain where the gate is, with a ditch, covered way, and glacis." In early July, Clapham marched with his troops from Fort Halifax, while the canoes and bateaux carried supplies downriver, encountering numerous falls and rapids which hindered their progress. On 14 August, Clapham wrote to Governor Morris: "We have the walls of the fort now above-half finished and our other works in such situation that we can make a very good defense against any body of French and Indians that shall seat themselves before us without cannon."

Clapham had largely completed Fort Augusta by late August 1756. Named for Augusta of Saxe-Gotha, the mother of King George III, it was the largest British fort built in Pennsylvania, with earthen walls more than two hundred feet long topped by wooden fortifications. Buildings included a bakery, smoke house, beef cistern, pork cistern, and a powder magazine with an underground powder keg. The wall facing the river was composed of upright logs, and the rear wall was made up of lengthwise logs. Beyond the main wall was a dry moat that was half as deep as the wall was high. Triangular bastions on each corner permitted a crossfire covering the entire extent of the wall. A well was located in the westernmost bastion. In front of the main gate, a small bridge over the moat could be raised in the event of an attack. Blockhouses connected by a stockade formed a covered way to the river.

Clapham was concerned that the fort would be vulnerable to French assault from the west, if the French were to deploy artillery. On 7 September 1756, he wrote to Franklin requesting permission to hire another carpenter for additional fortification of the fort's walls:

"If the Government designs to strengthen this Post by doubling the Fort with another Case of Logs and filling up the intermediate Space with Earth in order to render it Cannon Proof which I think ought to be done."

On 8 September 1756, he wrote to Franklin requesting additional supplies and horses:

"This Post, which is in my Opinion of the utmost Consequence to the Province, is already defensible against all the Power of Musquetry, but as it is from the Nature of its Situation expos’d to a more formidable Descent from the West Branch [of the Susquehanna River]. It ought I think to be render’d still stronger, for which Purpose a greater Number of Horses and Teams are necessary. ’Tis likewise expedient that this Garrison should be supply’d with at least Six Month’s Provisions and Stores equivalent."

In late October, Clapham described the final stages of the fort's construction: "In eight or ten days more the ditch will be carried quite around the parapet, the barrier gates finished and erected, and the pickets of the glacis completed."

The fort was garrisoned by sixteen officers and 337 men and had twelve cannons and two swivel guns. It served as base for the Third Battalion, Pennsylvania Regiment of Foot, known as the Augusta Regiment, which was originally formed to build and garrison Fort Augusta.

=== Military actions ===
In August 1756, Fort Granville was destroyed by French and Indian forces, and soon afterwards Clapham was informed by chief Oghaghradisha that several hundred French troops and Native American warriors had traveled down the Great Shamokin Path to destroy Fort Augusta. This raiding party had been gathered from the French posts at Fort Duquesne, Venango, and Fort Le Boeuf, and the Lenape village of Kittanning, and had assembled at the mouth of Anderson Creek, where they built bateaux to descend the Susquehanna River, bringing with them two or three small brass cannons. They observed Fort Augusta from a distance, however they were too far away for their guns to shoot from the hill opposite the fort. The force then withdrew after deciding that the fort was too well defended.

In November 1756, Clapham informed Denny that about fifty miles up the West Branch Susquehanna River was an Indian village with only ten families, located near Great Island (now known as Lock Haven, Pennsylvania). The inhabitants had formerly lived at Shamokin and were reportedly under French influence. Clapham believed that war parties from this village had been ambushing, killing and scalping soldiers and civilians, including the soldier killed in September at Bloody Spring. He ordered a raiding party of 42 men, with Andrew Montour acting as a guide, to destroy the village, and instructed the commander, Captain Hambright, "to Kill, Scalp, and capture as many as you can." The raiding party found the village empty, but returned later and destroyed it.

=== Problems and conflicts ===
Clapham and his men were dissatisfied when the Commissary General, James Young, arrived in mid-July to deliver their pay, much of which had been withheld. Young wrote to Governor Morris on 18 July:

"At Shamokin the people are extremely uneasy for their pay. The Colonel is highly displeased [that] I had not orders to pay him for his Captain's commission, likewise that I brought no money to pay the Battoe men; he talks loudly of his ill usage and threatens to leave the service; that he will go and join the Six Nations, whether they side with the English or the French."

Clapham immediately wrote to Governor Morris:

"Besides the duties of my commissions as colonel and captain, [I have] been obliged to discharge those of engineer and overseer at the same time, and undergone in the service incredible fatigues without materials and without thanks. [My] commission...never was yet supposed to include building forts and ten thousand other services which I have performed."

On 5 August 1756, Edward Shippen III wrote to his son, Colonel Joseph Shippen, at Shamokin: "You tell me the Colonel [Clapham] frequently says he will soon resign and go to Philadelphia."

Pay for troops and officers at Fort Augusta was delayed repeatedly, to the point where Clapham was forced to loan most of his salary to men and officers under his command to prevent them from deserting or leaving at the end of their enlistment. Shipments of provisions were frequently late, so that the fort's food supply sometimes dwindled to only one or two days' rations. Clapham had a reputation for being hot-tempered and arbitrary, and often had his subordinate officers arrested and imprisoned for minor infractions, releasing them after a few days without trial. By late 1756, construction projects and daily maintenance tasks were abandoned due to poor morale. On 8 December, Major James Burd took command of the fort.

=== Resignation, 1757 ===
Clapham resigned his command of the garrison in March, 1757. He was evidently an unpopular commander, as suggested by Edward Shippen III in a letter to Major James Burd on 26 March 1757:

"I congratulate you on the good news: Col. Clapham has resigned, (so Doctor Shippen says,) and if he is pleased you have no cause to be displeased, I am sure. I never doubted his skill in fighting Indians, nor his natural disposition to quarrel with and abuse all mankind. It was always my opinion, that...he was unfit to command a batallion belonging to the king of England."

On 5 April, Shippen wrote again to Major Burd, commenting on the news that Clapham intended to become a fur trader:

"I am glad you have got so well rid of Clapham as your Colonel, and if the poor fellow should desire a license to set up his trade at your camp, I hope you will grant him the favor; for though he did not understand the business of a commandant, yet he can bring credentials from the Carbuncle, alias Rednosed Club, in Boston, of his skill in hat making; and as he was well recommended by my countrymen as a good wood-ranger, he can never be at a loss for materials to make up...For a man who had not cunning enough to keep a ball at his foot which turned him ~365 per annum, could not be expected to outwit foxes, beavers, and such other sagacious creatures."

== Pittsburgh census, 1761 ==
After assisting in the establishment of frontier forts, Clapham retired from the army and moved to Pittsburgh in July 1760. On 14 April 1761, Clapham published the first census of the population of Pittsburgh, conducted under the direction of Colonel Henry Bouquet, in which he recorded 104 houses and a total population of 332 people, composed of 95 officers, soldiers and their families, and 238 civilians.

== Trading post ==
Soon afterwards, Clapham entered into an economic venture with Indian trader George Croghan to develop a trading post and a settlement, later referred to as Oswegly Old Town. In 1762, he applied for the right to settle on land 18 miles southeast of Fort Pitt, which he had purchased from George Croghan, and his application was approved by Colonel Bouquet and General Robert Monckton. Clapham cleared his land in February 1763, and subsequently operated a trading post and extensive plantation where Sewickley Creek enters into the Youghiogheny River (between present-day Sutersville, Pennsylvania and West Newton, Pennsylvania). He and Croghan planned to sell corn, hay, and cattle at Fort Pitt. He was a well known and respected figure on the trans-Appalachian frontier in Pennsylvania, but unlike his associate George Croghan, he was not trusted by the Ohio Valley tribes.

== Death and burial, 1763 ==
Clapham's Trading Post was the site of the first attack in Pennsylvania of Pontiac's Rebellion. On 28 May 1763, Keekyuscung, his son Wolf, and two other Indians allegedly murdered and scalped Clapham, his wife and child at Clapham's farm on Sewickley Creek. This was reportedly done in retaliation for the destruction of a Lenape community at Great Island (Lock Haven, Pennsylvania), ordered by Clapham in November, 1756. Wolf may also have been seeking revenge for having been arrested and imprisoned at Fort Pitt in 1762 on charges of horse theft. He had escaped and plotted his revenge together with his father. Soon after the massacre, Pontiac’s allied tribes in other regions of Pennsylvania captured Fort Presque Isle and laid siege to Fort Pitt.

William Trent, then Superintendent of Fort Pitt, wrote on 29 May:

"At Break of day this Morning three Men came from Col. Clapham's who was settled at the Oswegly Old Town about 25 Miles from here on the Youghyogeane River, with an account that Col. Clapham, with one of his Men, two women and a child were Merdered by Wolfe and some other Delaware Indians, about two o'clock the day before...The women that were killed at Col. Clapham's were treated in such a brutal manner that Decency forbids the Mentioning."

An article in The Pennsylvania Gazette on 31 May stated:

"There is most melancholy news here, the Indians have broke out in divers Places and have murdered Colonel Chapman (sic) and his Family; and two of our Men at the Saw-Mill just by the Ford, and scalps taken off each Man."

On 2 May 1764, Colonel Henry Bouquet drew up a series of demands on Native American tribes with whom he was negotiating for peace as part of the 1764 Treaty of Fort Niagara, including "that they deliver up the murderers of Clapham...to be put to death for their Crimes." Both Keekyuscung and his son Wolf had been killed at the Battle of Bushy Run on 6 August 1763.

William Clapham is buried in the cemetery at Trinity Cathedral in Pittsburgh.

== In popular culture ==
There is a reference to "Captain Clapham" in an early version of the song Yankee Doodle, printed in an undated broadside titled “The Recruiting Officer, Together with Yanky Doodle,” probably published between 1748 and before Clapham completed his service in Canada in 1754:

Here's Father and I, for Canady,
Likewise another Brother,
And Seven more we leave on shore,
For to take Care of Mother.
Tho' I am young I do belong,
To valiant Captain Clapham,
I'll run my Chance and fight the French,
And that’s the Way we’ll nab 'em.

== See also ==
- Father Le Loutre's War
- Raid on Dartmouth (1751)
- Fort Hunter
- Fort Halifax
- Fort Augusta
- Pennsylvania forts in the French and Indian War
