= Shamokin (village) =

Shamokin or Otzinachson Schahamokink
- Historic Native American village
- Etymology: Unami: Shahë-Mokink "place of crawfish" or Iroquoian languages: Otzinachson "The Demon's Den"
- Former location of Shamokin, present-day site of Sunbury, Pennsylvania

- Former location of Shamokin in Pennsylvania Shamokin (the United States)
- Coordinates: 40°51′50″N 76°47′21″W
- State: Pennsylvania
- Present-day Community: Sunbury, Pennsylvania
- Founded: before 1711
- Abandoned: May 1756

Population
  - Estimate (1745): 300−400

Shamokin (/ʃəˈmoʊkɪn/; Saponi Algonquian Schahamokink: "place of crawfish") (Lenape: Shahëmokink) was a multi-ethnic Native American trading village on the Susquehanna River, located partially within the limits of the modern cities of Sunbury and Shamokin Dam, Pennsylvania. It should not be confused with present-day Shamokin, Pennsylvania, located to the east. The village was the focus of missionary efforts, and then was the staging area for raids on English settlements in Pennsylvania during the French and Indian War. It was burned and abandoned by the Lenape in May 1756. A few months later, Fort Augusta was constructed on the site of the village.

== Etymology ==
"Shamokin" is usually described as derived from Schahamokink or Shahëmokink, ("place of crawfish") but it may be also a variant of the Lenape term Shackamaxon, from the Lenape term Sakimauchheen Ing which means "to make a chief or king place" referring to the residence of the foremost Lenape sachem (sakima) on the Delaware River.

The community is also sometimes referred to by the Iroquois name Otzinachson, which was according to Count Zinzendorf, the name the Iroquois gave to a "large cave, in a rocky hill in the wilderness...From it, the surrounding country and the West Branch of the Susquehanna are called Otzinachon, i. e., The Demon's Den, for here the evil spirits, say the Indians, have their seats and hold their revels."

== Establishment and population ==
The date of first human settlement is not known. Stone tools and cord-marked pottery dating to between nine thousand and fifteen hundred years ago have been found in the area. A village definitely existed by 1711, when the Shawnee chief Opessa Straight Tail reportedly fled to Shamokin after being accused of complicity in the death of Francis Le Tort, an indentured servant who had fled into the forest with several escaped slaves that he was apparently trying to help. Le Tort was indentured to the Swedish-American trader, John Hansson Steelman (1655–1749) (also referred to as Stelman or Tillmann), and after Steelman offered bounty to some Shawnee warriors of Opessa's tribe to bring him back dead or alive, Francis was killed. Opessa took refuge in Shamokin and while there, he married Polly, Sassoonan's daughter.

At least one source states that the Delaware chief Sassoonan (Allumapees) was living at Shamokin as early as 1718. However, historian C. A. Weslager indicates that it was probably Shawnee migrants who first settled there. Delaware Indians displaced by German immigrants in Tulpehocken Creek Valley relocated to Shamokin in 1728. A large population of Delaware Indians was also forcibly resettled there after 1737 when they lost rights to their land in the Walking Purchase. Canasatego of the Six Nations, enforcing the Walking Purchase on behalf of George Thomas, Deputy Governor of Pennsylvania, ordered the Delaware Indians to go to two places on the Susquehanna River, Wyomink and Shamokin. Early in the eighteenth century, the village consisted of Iroquois migrants from the north, as well as Shawnee and Lenape settlers moving away from expanding white settlements in Pennsylvania, and also some Saponi and Tutelo from Virginia.

A 1727 map by John Taylor, of the forks of the Susquehanna River, shows Shamokin on both north and south banks of the west branch, with James Le Tort's store to the east. John Scull's store is marked on the east bank of the Susquehanna.

== The Shamokin Traders ==
1755 map by John Mitchell showing Shamokin, to the upper right of map's center.

From 1727 to 1756, Shamokin was one of the largest and most influential Indian settlements in Pennsylvania. Traders John Petty and Henry Smith had a trading post at Shamokin as early as 1728, as did Samuel Cozzens, John Hart, John Fisher, Timothy Higgins, Jonah Davenport, Alexander and Jack Armstrong, Woodworth Arnold, James Smith, John Scull and his brother Nicholas Scull II, and Anthony Sadowski. James Le Tort established a trading post at Chillisquaque Creek (known at the time by colonists as "Chenastry") about six miles north of Shamokin. These early traders are sometimes referred to as "the Shamokin Traders."

Life as an Indian trader was dangerous and unpredictable. Anthony Sadowski wrote to John Petty in August 1728 that "the Sauanos [Shawnees] have hanged Timothy Higgins upon a pole of their cabin," although he does not say why. Petty wrote back that, while on their way to Shamokin, they had met Higgins, who "was thought to be hanged, escapt his life very narrowly...We dare not take him [back to Shamokin]." John Hart and John Fisher were accidentally shot and killed during a hunting expedition with a group of Lenapes in the fall of 1729. Jack Armstrong and his servants Woodworth Arnold and James Smith were killed in 1744 by Lenape Indians over a stolen horse. Jonah Davenport lost much of his property during violence with Indians and died in poverty near Lancaster, Pennsylvania.

A later arrival was Thomas McKee (1695–1769), father of Indian agent Alexander McKee (1735–1799). He arrived in the area before 1735, when Alexander was born, and had two posts on the left bank of the Susquehanna, near Shamokin. He quickly became fluent in the Delaware language. The Moravian Bishop John F. Cammerhoff and David Zeisberger visited McKee's trading post on 13 January 1748. In his journal the bishop wrote:

At nine-o'clock we reached Thomas McKee's, the last white settlement on the river, below Shamokin. McKee holds a captain's commission under the government; is an extensive Indian Trader; bears a good name among them; and drives a brisk trade with the Allegheny country. His wife, who was brought up among the Indians, speaks but little English. They received us with much kindness and hospitality.

== Leadership ==
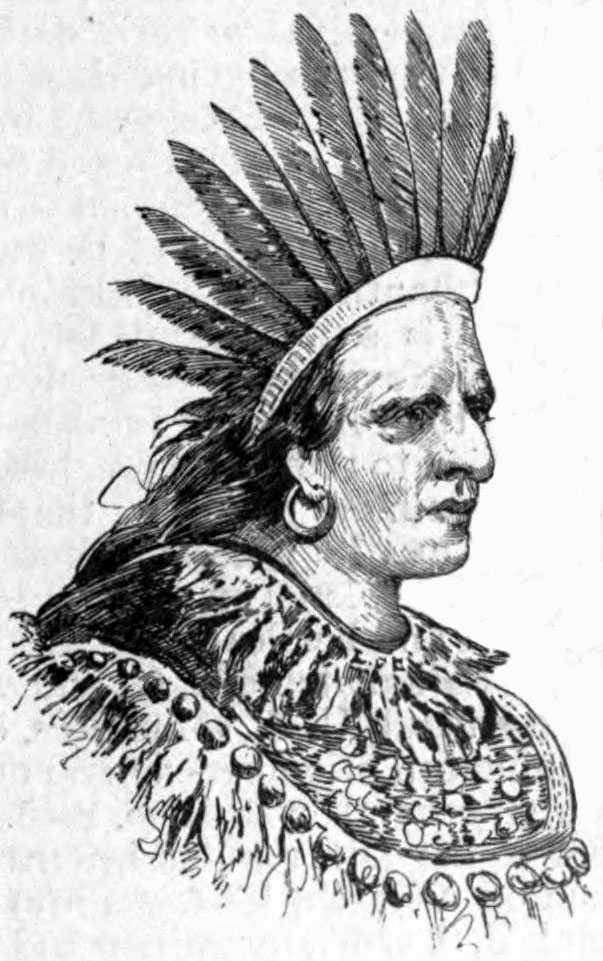
Shikellamy's portrait from the Appletons' article on "Swatane"

In August 1736, Chief Allumapees (Sassoonan) visited Philadelphia and reported that "some of the Six Nations had been lately at Shamokin and had enquired kindly touching their Brethren there, towards whom they shewed much Love and Friendship." On 18 September, The Pennsylvania Provincial Council was informed by Conrad Weiser that "there was a large number of those People with many of their Chiefs arrived at Shamokin, on Sasquehanna." This was a diplomatic visit intended to confirm the dominance of the Iroquois Confederacy over the Delaware. In October over a hundred of these Iroquois met with Pennsylvania authorities at Stenton, James Logan's country home in Logan, Philadelphia, to affirm friendship and to encourage trade. The Delawares were major suppliers of furs and skins as part of the growing fur trade in Pennsylvania.

The Oneida chief Shikellamy moved to Shamokin in 1737, where he served as a representative of the Iroquois, supervising Lenape affairs. He was visited there in March of that year by Conrad Weiser. Shikellamy was there when Sassoonan died at Shamokin in 1747. Shikellamy died at Shamokin on 6 December 1748, after which a faction of Delawares left and founded Tioga, Pennsylvania. Chief Shingas may have been born at Shamokin.

== Visit by Count Zinzendorf, 1742 ==
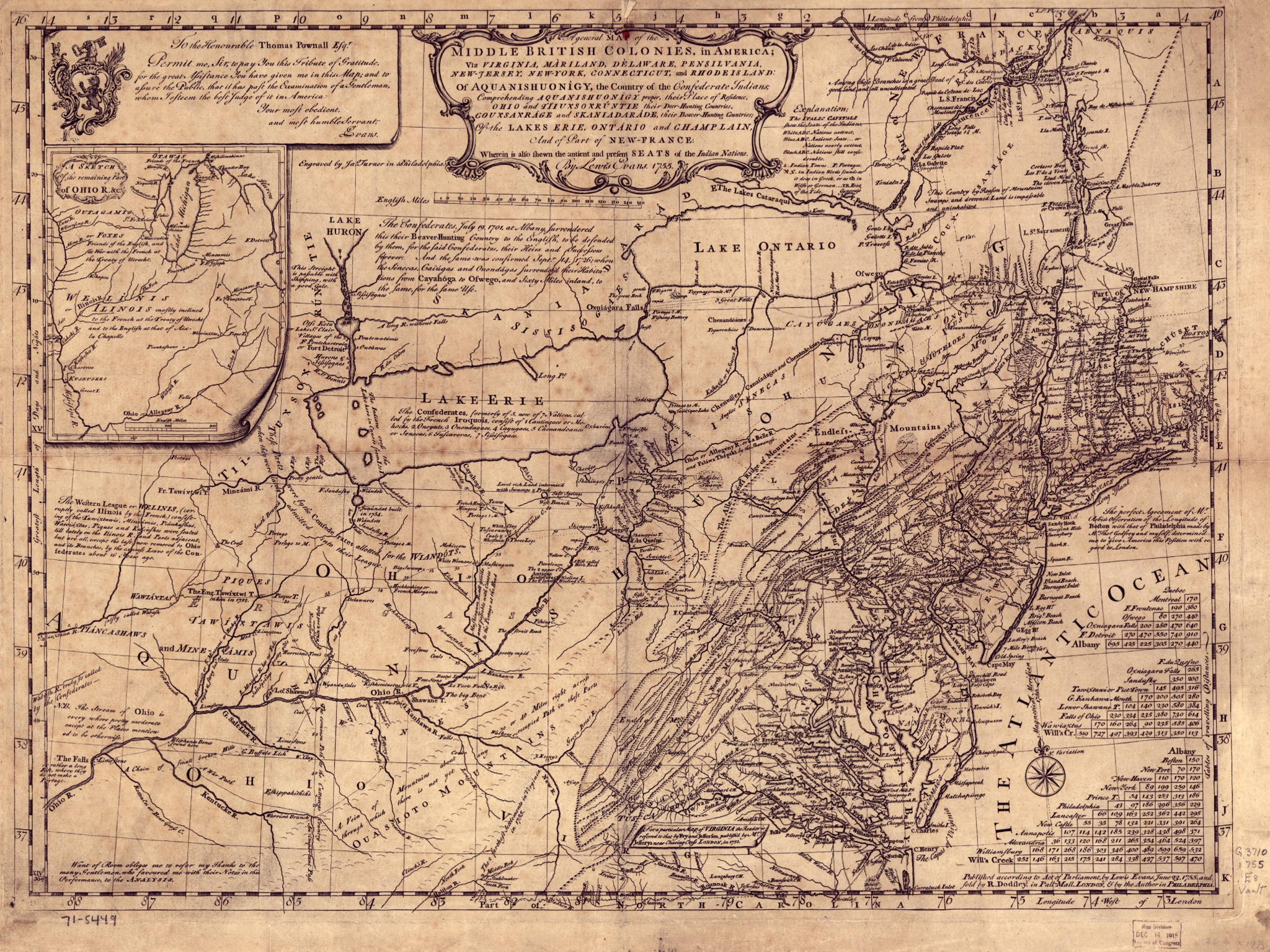
1755 map by Lewis Evans showing Shamokin just below map's center.

Count Nicolaus von Zinzendorf visited Shamokin together with Conrad Weiser and Anna Nitschmann in September 1742, and met there with Shikellamy. The Count believed that Shikellamy, who had converted to Christianity, could serve as a vital agent of change in converting all Indians to Christianity. Shikellamy permitted the Moravians to establish a mission at Shamokin, and he served as an emissary between the Moravians and Madame Montour's village of Otstonwakin at the mouth of Loyalsock Creek and French Margaret's village at the mouth of Lycoming Creek. Shikellamy permitted the Moravians to stay in his home, lent them horses for work, and helped them build their homes. He formally converted to Christianity in November 1748 at the Moravian city of Bethlehem. On his return journey Shikellamy became ill and died in Shamokin on December 6, 1748.

== Peace negotiations, 1743 ==
After a series of violent conflicts between Indians and white settlers, Meshemethequater, Sassoonan and other chiefs from the Six Nations (including Shikellamy), the Tuscaroras, and the Lenape met with Conrad Weiser and Andrew Montour at Shamokin on 4 February 1743, and received wampum from Weiser, who was trying to persuade the Shawnees not to attack English traders living on the Allegheny, to prevent war from erupting. Ultimately, the negotiations were successful.

== Visit by Bartram and Evans, 1743 ==
John Bartram and Lewis Evans visited Shamokin in July 1743. Bartram wrote in his journal:

July 8: We crossed the creek and rode along a rich bottom near the river for two miles...beyond which, two miles good oak land brought us to the town of Shamokin. It contains eight cabbins near the river's bank...It is by means of this neighborhood that we may reasonably hope...that a very beneficial trade may be extended...I quartered in a trader's cabbin, and about midnight the Indians came and called up him and his squaw...She sold the Indians rum, with which being quickly intoxicated, men and women began first to sing and then dance around the fire; then the women would run out to other cabbins and soon return, leaving the men singing and dancing the war dance, which continued all the next day...As soon as we alighted they shewed us where to lay our baggage, and then brought us a bowl of boiled squashes cold...I had learnt not to despise good Indian food.

July 9: After breakfast Lewis Evans and myself went to the point of the mountain...and having taken a pleasant view of the mountains and of the charming plain of Shamokin, 2 miles long and above one broad, skirted on the west and north by the river, and encompassed east and partly south with lofty hills...we returned to the town and dined.

July 10: We departed [from Shamokin] in the morning, with Shickcalamy and his son, he being the chief man in the town, which consisted of Delaware Indians...Our journey now lay through very rich bottoms to a creek, six miles from Shamokin, a great extent of fruitful low ground still continuing. Here we found a fine meadow of grass on our right, and rich dry ground on the left...peach-trees, plumbs, and excellent grapes.

== Visits by Conrad Weiser, 1744-1745 ==
In May 1744 Conrad Weiser was sent to Shamokin to investigate the murder of Jack Armstrong, a trader, and two of his servants, after a dispute over a horse. Weiser interviewed Shikellamy and Allumapees and learned that a Lenape Indian named Mussemeelin owed Armstrong a debt, and in late 1743 Armstrong had taken Mussemeelin's horse as payment. Mussemeelin later paid Armstrong 20 shillings to settle the debt, but Armstrong refused to return the horse. Mussemeelin and two of his friends later found Armstrong and his servants clearing a road on the Juniata River and killed them. Afterwards, Mussemeelin's friends told others in the village about the murder, and eventually they were arrested and made to confess. Weiser arrived on 2 May 1744 and heard the confession. Goods that were taken from Armstrong were returned to his brother Alexander, and Mussemeelin and one of the two accomplices were handed over to Weiser, to stand trial in Lancaster, Pennsylvania. The second accomplice was arrested, but the Indians allowed him to escape. The site of Jack Armstrong's murder, in a gorge on the Juniata River, was afterwards known as Jacks Narrows, and the ridge nearby is still known as Jacks Mountain.

In September Weiser and eight other men built a house at Shamokin for Shikellamy, which he described in a 29 September letter to James Logan:

The day before yesterday I came back from Shohomokin, where I have been with eight young men of my country people, whom Shickalemy hired to build a locke house for him, and I went with them to direct them. We finished the house in 17 days; it is 49 1/2 foot long and 17 1/2 wide, and covered with singels.

The designation of "locke house" may indicate either that this was intended as a storehouse that could be locked, or possibly a jail.

== Visit by Bishop Spangenberg, 1745 ==
In June 1745, Bishop August Gottlieb Spangenberg, Weiser and Zeisberger visited Shamokin where they met with Shikellamy and the elderly chief Sassoonan: "[Spangenberg] and Conrad crossed the river to visit the Indian King {Sassoonan] who lives there, and had the honor to smoke a pipe with him." The bishop described "Allummapees" as "very old, almost blind, and very poor; but withal has still power over, and is beloved by his people and is a friend of the English." Spangenberg was also informed of David Brainerd's visit to Shamokin in May. Shikellamy reported that

[The Reverend Brainerd] had assembled the Delawares in Shikellmy's house, and...informed them that on Sundays they should assemble as the whites do, and pray as they do. Hence he would build a house for that purpose, and stay with them two years. That the Governor had given him orders to that effect, and he would be glad to see the Indians hearken to him. To this Shikellmy said: "We are Indians, and don't wish to be trans formed into white men. The English are our Brethren, but we never promised to become what they are. As little as we desire the preacher to become Indian, so little ought he to desire the Indians to become preachers. He should not build a house here, they don't want one."

They also visited Madame Montour, Andrew Montour's mother, on Shamokin Island.

== Visits by David Brainerd, 1745 ==
In May and September 1745 Presbyterian missionary David Brainerd visited Shamokin and wrote:

Shaumoking, Sept. 1745. Sept. 13: ...Arrived at the Indian town I aimed at on the Susquehannah, called Shaumoking, one of the places and the largest of them which I visited May last. I was kindly received and entertained by the Indians but had little satisfaction by reason of the Heathenish revel they then held in the house where I was obliged to lodge...The Town lies partly on the east and the west shores of the river, and partly on the island. It contains upwards of fifty houses and three hundred inhabitants, though I never saw much more than half that number in it...About one-half are Delawares; the others, Senecas and Tutelars. The Indians of this place are accounted the most drunken, mischievous, and ruffian-like fellows of any in these parts; and Satan seems to have his seat in this town in an eminent manner.

Sept 16: Spent the forenoon with the Indians, endeavoring to instruct them from house to house, and to engage them as far as I could, to be friendly to Christianity. Towards night, went to one part of the town where they were sober, got together near fifty of them and discoursed to them, having first obtained the king's cheerful consent. There was surprising attention among them, and they manifested a considerable desire of being further instructed.

== Moravian mission at Shamokin, 1747-1755 ==
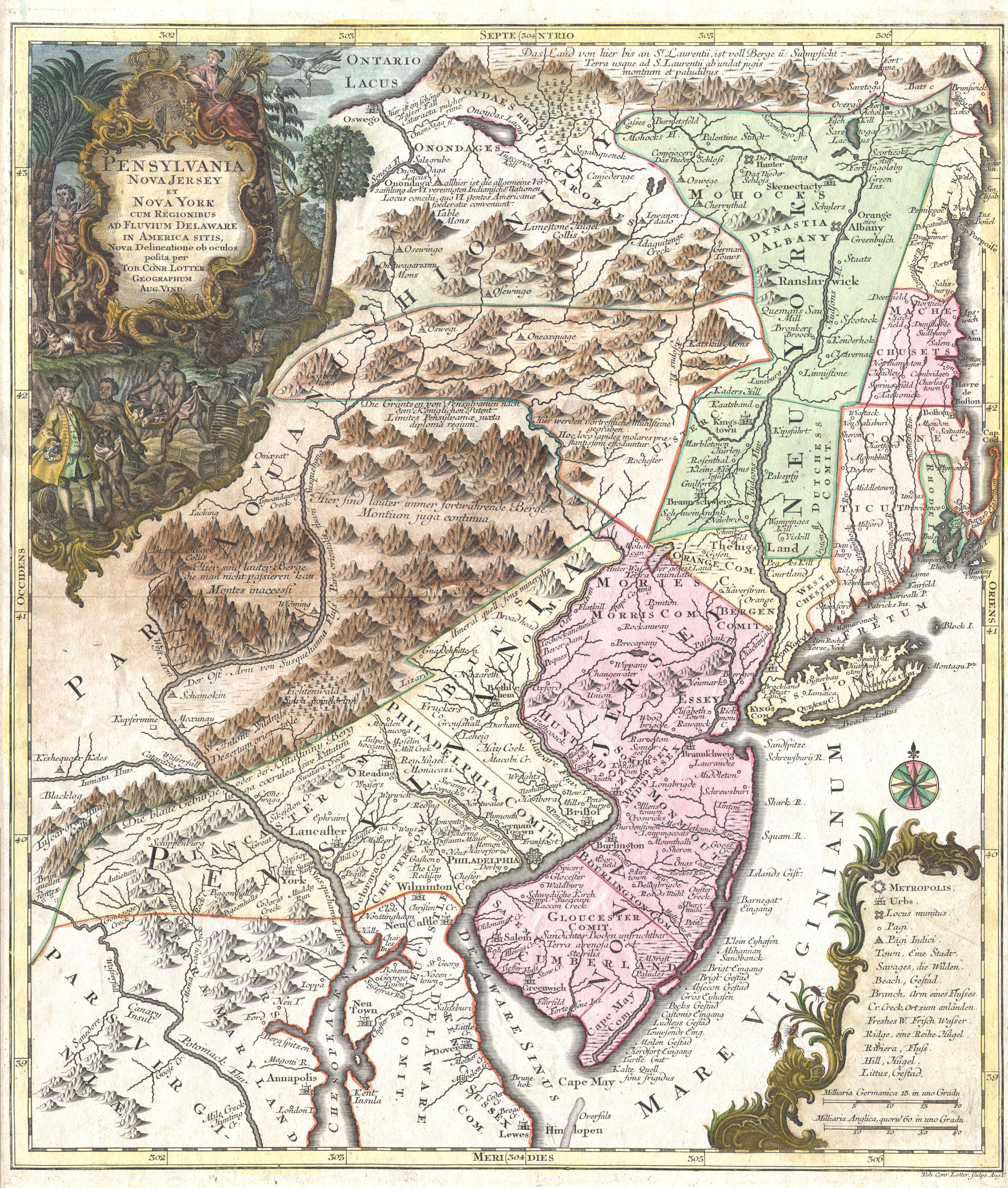
Tobias Conrad Lotter's 1756 map of Eastern Pennsylvania and New Jersey depicting "Schamokin", left side of page.

The Moravian mission in Shamokin was set up in 1747 primarily as a blacksmith’s shop to serve the Iroquois and their protected tribes, the Delaware, Tutelo, Conoy, and Shawnee. The leader of the Moravian church, Count Zinzendorf, recognized the strategic importance of Shamokin as the seat of Shikellamy, de facto leader of the Delaware. On 5 May 1746 Conrad Weiser sent a request to the Governor of Pennsylvania stating that a blacksmith at Shamokin was urgently needed. In November the Governor responded, "The Five Nations of Indians have taken up the Hatchet against our Enemies. Therefore you may write to Mr Spangenberg that he may send People among the Indians when he will." Approval was given to establish a forge at Shamokin.

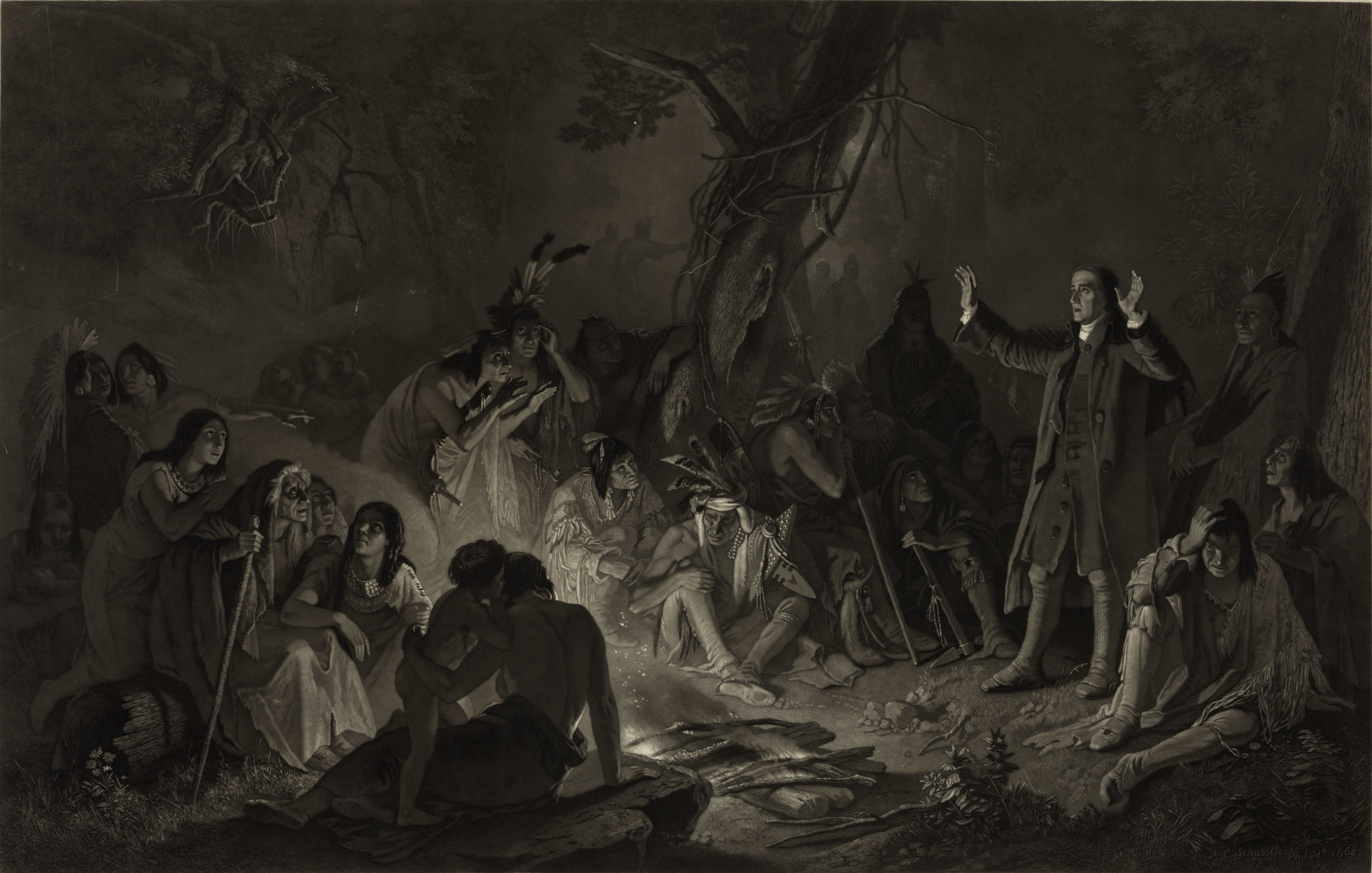
Moravian missionary David Zeisberger preaching to the Indians.

In April 1747, Shikellamy insisted to missionary John Martin Mack that any work done at the smith for the Five Nations should be without charge, saying, "I desire, T’girketonti (Spangenberg's Iroquois name) my brother, that when something is done to their flints that it is done for free, because they have nothing with which to pay. However, when they return, and they have something done, then they would have to pay for it." All other Native American customers to the smithy had to pay for their services in deer, fox, and racoon skins.

In late spring 1747, Moravian missionaries arrived in Shamokin and discussed the blacksmith project in a conference with the chief Shikellamy and his advisors. The forge and a mission were built in June and July 1747 and by the end of July the forge was opened. The first blacksmith, Anton Schmidt, arrived on July 23 with his wife Catharina. The diary entry for that day states, "It was as though a king had arrived, even Shikellamy was very happy." He gave Schmidt an Iroquois name, Rachwistonis, and immediately accompanied him and Hagen down the river to Harris' Ferry to collect the rest of the tools for the blacksmith's shop.

In January 1748 the Moravian community was visited by Bishop John Cammerhoff.

The Moravian mission was strictly controlled to avoid creating a European-style settlement. Trading was limited to skins and furs and initially the missionaries were not permitted to own livestock. Some of these regulations were relaxed as the mission grew and other Europeans settled nearby. In 1754 Conrad Weiser surveyed the land near Shamokin with plans to build a new settlement in the area.

In July 1754, much of the land west of the Susquehanna was transferred from the Six Nations to Pennsylvania at the Albany Congress. However, Shamokin was not sold and was reserved by the Six Nations, "to settle such of our Nations as shall come to us from the Ohio or any others who shall deserve to be in our Alliance." According to Weslager, "the Pennsylvania authorities had no opposition to the Six Nations reserving Wyoming and Shamokin from the sale, since friendly Delawares, including Teedyuscung and his people living in those settlements--and any other Indians who might be placed there--constituted a buffer against Connecticut." The presence of the Moravian mission was viewed as an indication that the Lenape there would support the British, or at least remain neutral in any conflict with the French.

== French and Indian War ==
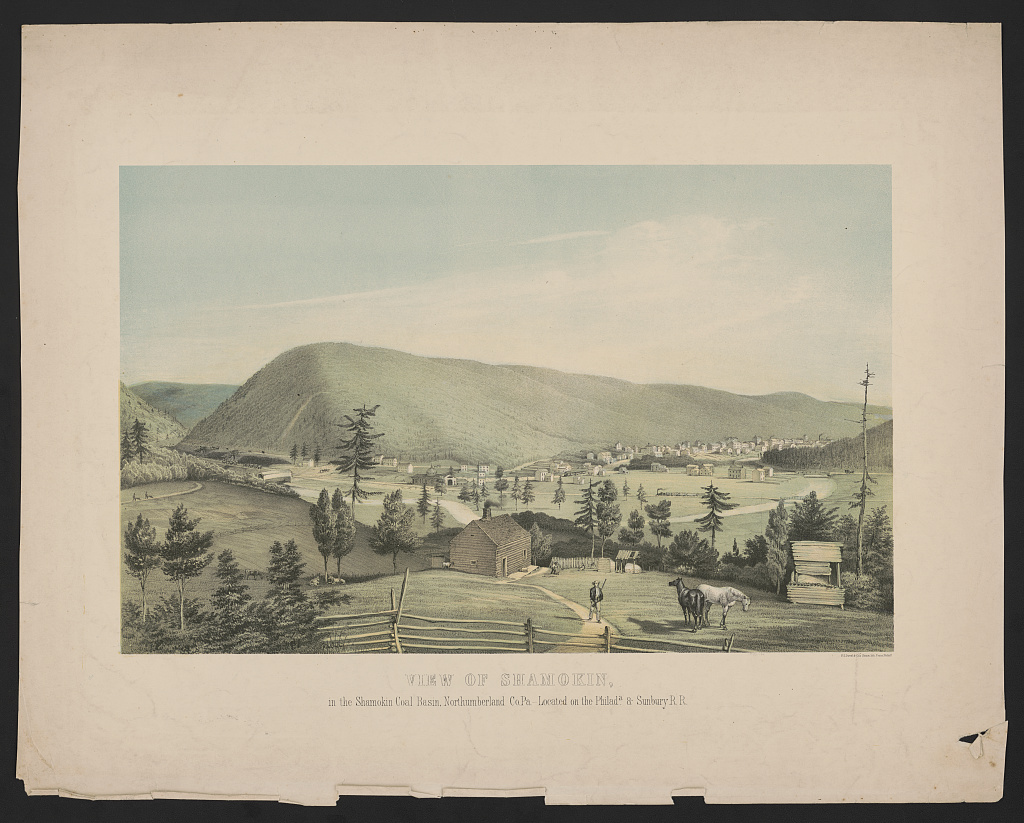
View of the site of Shamokin village as it appeared in about 1857, with Otzinachson hill ("the Demon's Den, the name the Iroquois gave to a large cave, in a rocky hill in the wilderness") seen to the left.

The French and Indian War brought fighting to much of the region. The Delaware Indian residents of Shamokin remained neutral for much of the early part of the war, in part because a drought and unseasonable frost in Shamokin in 1755 left them without provisions. However, some Delaware Indians at Shamokin joined the war against Pennsylvania and the English after Braddock's defeat at the Battle of the Monongahela on 9 July 1755. On 16 October 1755 Lenape Indians allied with the French attacked and destroyed the town of Penns Creek, Pennsylvania about ten miles west of Shamokin. As news of the Penn's Creek massacre spread, panic gripped the settlements. Trading post owner John Harris Jr. wrote to the governor and offered to lead an expedition upriver to try to pacify the Native Americans and find out the mindset of those at Shamokin, since the Indians there were known to be friendly to settlers. He gathered a group of 40 or 50 men and set out on 22 October.

At Shamokin, they found a gathering of Lenape painted all in black who had come from the Ohio and Allegheny River Valleys. Andrew Montour, an Indian of mixed Oneida, Algonquin and French ancestry, was among those painted in black but was known to Harris and often acted as an interpreter. He advised Harris to return home immediately along the east side of the Susquehanna. Harris and his men started back but disregarded Montour's warning to stay on the east side of the river. On 25 October they were ambushed by twenty or thirty Lenape, who fired on them, forcing Harris's men to jump into the river, where four of them drowned while trying to reach the opposite bank. on 28 October Harris sent a report to the governor in which he states:

The Indians are all assembling themselves at Shamokin to counsel; a large body of them were there four days ago. I cannot learn their intentions, but...there is not a sufficient number of them to oppose the enemy; and, perhaps, they will join the enemy [the French] against us...At the same time, some of the Shamokin Indians seem friendly, and others appear like enemies.

In November 1755, following the Gnadenhütten massacre in which eleven missionaries were killed and the mission house was burned, the Moravian missionaries at Shamokin, in fear of their lives, abandoned the mission and fled to Bethlehem, Pennsylvania.

There were only about 200 warriors among the Shamokin Lenape, but their numbers were soon bolstered by approximately 700 Ohio Lenape who came east to join them in their raids. By March 1756, five months after the massacre at Penn's Creek, they had killed some 200 settlers and taken an equal number captive. Settlers across eastern Pennsylvania left their homesteads and moved to more populated areas to the south and east.

== Abandonment, 1756 ==
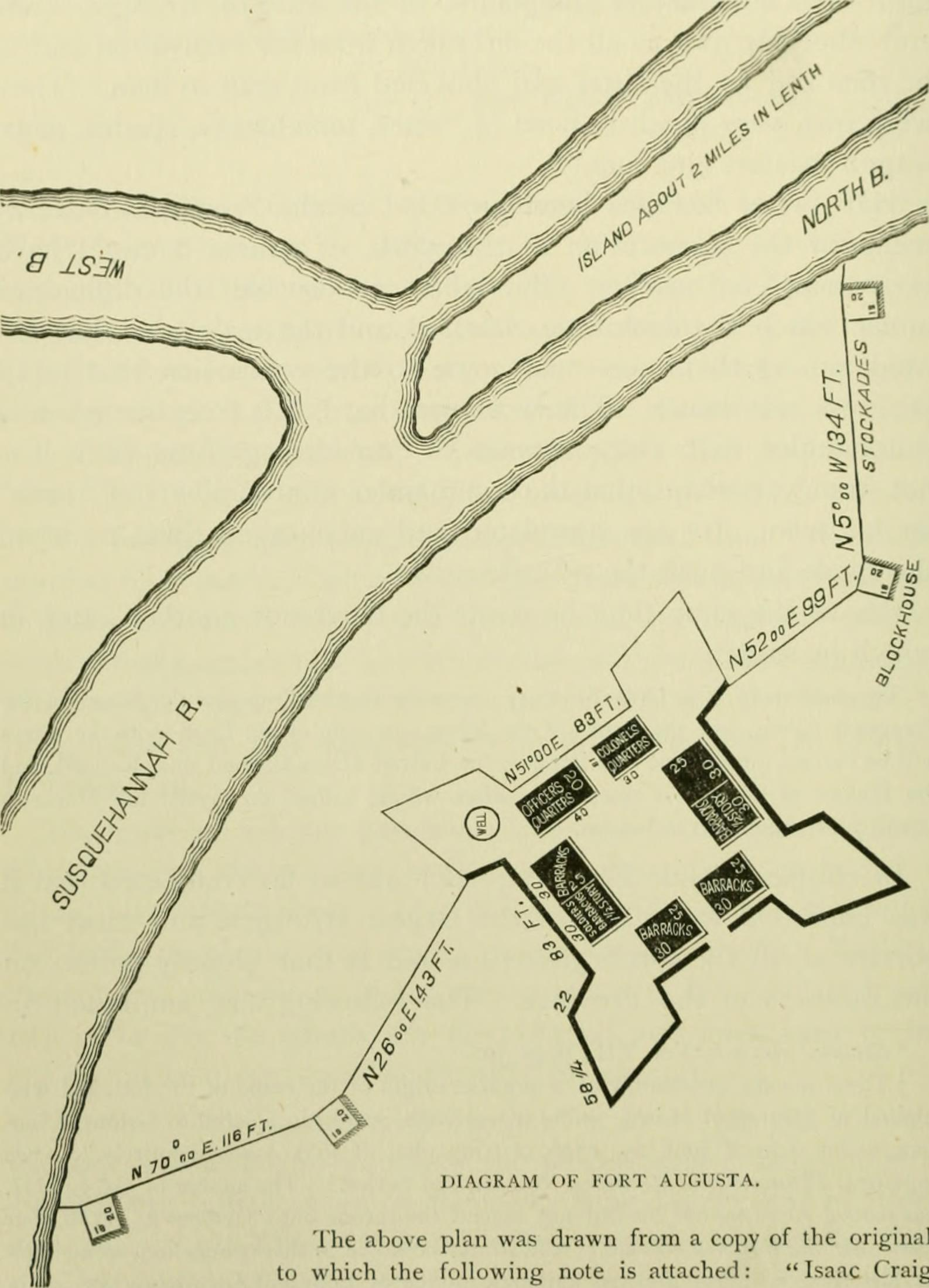
Plan of Fort Augusta on the east bank of the Susquehanna River as it was laid out on June 25, 1756, at the former location of Shamokin, showing Shamokin Island, where Madame Montour lived.

On 14 April 1756, Pennsylvania Governor Robert Hunter Morris officially declared war on the Delaware Nation, offering a bounty of $130 for the scalp of every Lenape male over ten years of age and $50 for a Lenape woman's scalp, or $150 for a male Lenape prisoner and $130 for a female one. Concerned over the possibility of attack, the leaders of Shamokin burned the village and the population relocated to another community on Nescopeck Creek. A scouting party led by George Allen visited the site on 3 June and found it abandoned.

== Fort Augusta ==
Governor Robert Hunter Morris ordered the construction of forts garrisoned with colonial militia, and in early 1756 Fort Augusta, Fort Shirley, Fort Lyttleton and Fort Granville were built. Plans to build a fort on the Susquehanna were made in late 1755, but not implemented until June 1756 when Colonel William Clapham and Major James Burd finally received sufficient funding and supplies to begin construction at the site of the village of Shamokin. Fort Augusta was largely completed by late August 1756. It was the largest British fort built in Pennsylvania, with earthen walls more than two hundred feet long topped by wooden fortifications. The fort was garrisoned by sixteen officers and 337 men and served as base for the Third Battalion, Pennsylvania Regiment of Foot, known as the Augusta Regiment, which was originally formed to build and garrison Fort Augusta.

In November 1756, Colonel Clapham informed Deputy Governor William Denny that about fifty miles up the West Branch Susquehanna River was an Indian village with only ten families, located near Great Island (now known as Lock Haven, Pennsylvania). The inhabitants had formerly lived at Shamokin and were reportedly under French influence. Clapham believed that war parties from this village had been ambushing, killing and scalping soldiers and civilians, including the soldier killed in September at Bloody Spring. He ordered a raiding party of 42 men, with Andrew Montour acting as a guide, to destroy the village, and instructed the commander, Captain Hambright, "to Kill, Scalp, and capture as many as you can." The raiding party found the village empty, but returned later and destroyed it.

== Archaeological investigations ==
Archaeological investigations conducted in 1978 and 1979 on a vacant property (called the Charles Cobler property) just north of the Hunter House found large amounts of fill materials associated with the fort's construction and its demolition. Below this, archaeologists uncovered the remains of the village of Shamokin and even earlier prehistoric occupations. Numerous Native American artifacts, dating mainly to the Archaic and Middle Woodland periods between nine thousand and fifteen hundred years ago, were recovered. These consisted of stone tools, spear points, cord-marked pottery, and large cooking hearths.

Pennsylvania Historical and Museum Commission archaeologists also found gunflints, musket balls, broken glass, white clay pipe fragments, and a variety of metal objects, many of which can be dated to the mid-eighteenth century. Portions of a palisade wall, a trench, and a dry moat were discovered and artifacts such as burned cow, sheep, pig, and horse bones, gun parts, buttons, cannon balls, and glazed colonial ceramics as well as fragments of iron and brass, slag, charcoal, worked gun parts, stone from a foundation, and highly oxidized soil indicated the presence of a blacksmith shop. This shop was identified as that constructed by the Moravian missionaries who lived at Shamokin until 1755.

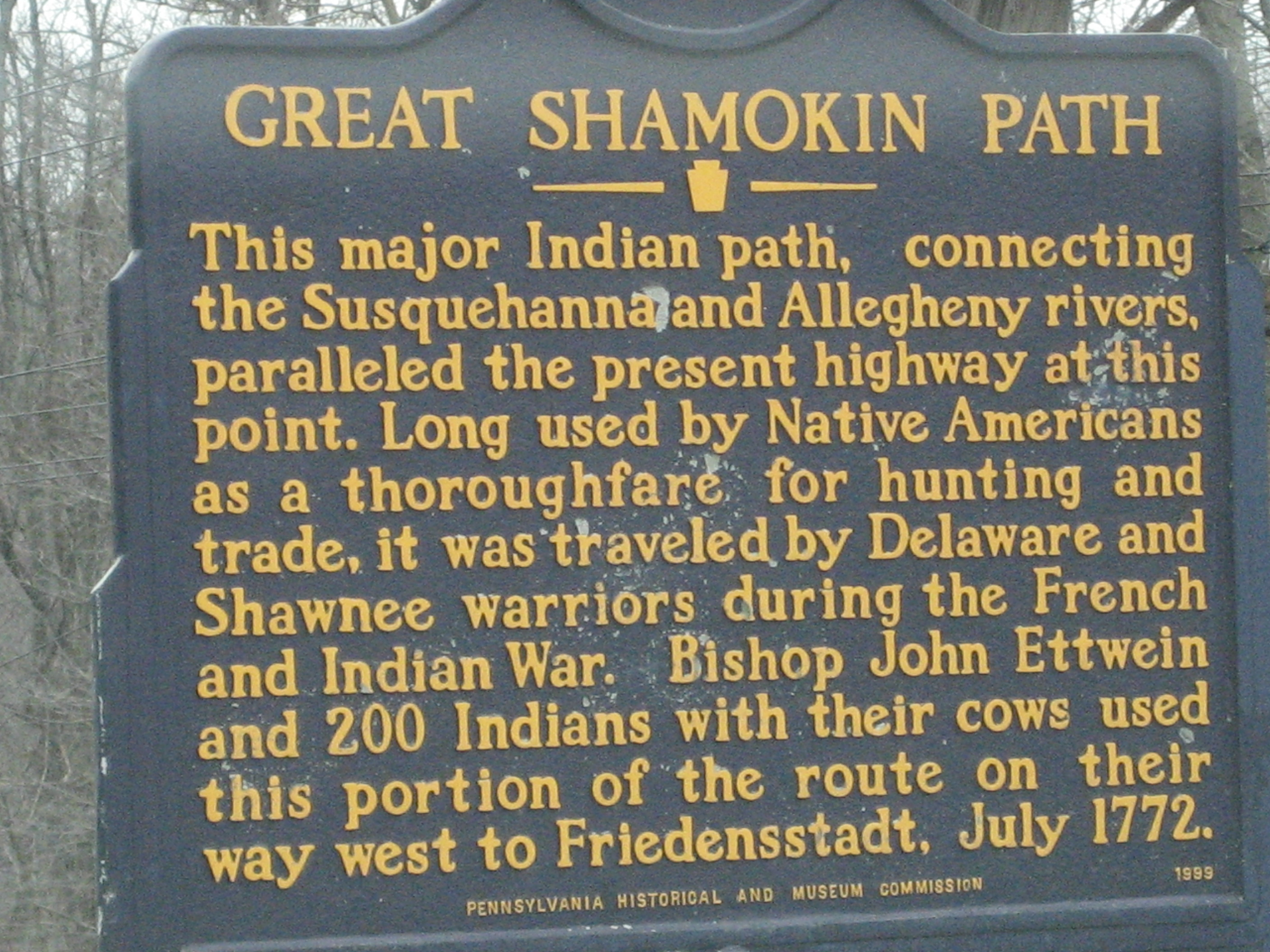
Great Shamokin Path Pennsylvania Historical Marker on Pennsylvania Route 150 west of Lock Haven

== Great Shamokin Path ==
The Great Shamokin Path (also known as the "Shamokin Path") was a major Native American trail in Pennsylvania that ran from Shamokin along the left bank of the West Branch Susquehanna River north and then west to the Great Island (near modern-day Lock Haven). There it left the river and continued further west to Chinklacamoose (what is now the borough of Clearfield) and finally Kittanning on the Allegheny River. Pennsylvania was criss-crossed with well-traveled trails, as navigation by canoe was impractical due to the lack of the canoe birch (Betula papyrifera), which does not grow in the area. Eleven major Indian paths or trade routes led into Shamokin: The Bottom Path, the Catawissa Path, the Great Island Path, the Great Shamokin Path, the Great Warriors Path, the Paxtang Path, the Penns Creek Path, the Susquehanna Path, the Tulpehocken Path, the Tuscarora Path, and the Wyoming Path. These trails were level and direct and were situated above flood level or along well-drained ridges.

== See also ==
- Logstown
- Kuskusky
- Kittanning (village)
- Sassoonan
- Saucunk
