= John Martin Mack =

- Born: Johann Martin Mack; 13 April 1715; Württemberg, Germany
- Died: 9 June 1784 (aged 69); Friedensthal, Saint Croix
- Occupation: Moravian bishop
- Known for: Involved in founding the city of Bethlehem, Pennsylvania
- Spouse: Jeannette Mack

Johann Martin Mack (13 April 1715 – 9 June 1784), also known as John Martin Mack, was a native of Württemberg, Germany and Moravian bishop, who was involved in founding the city of Bethlehem, Pennsylvania. He also was Württemberg's first evangelical missionary.

== Biography ==
Mack comes from Laichingen (Swabian Alb), which was a centre for linen weaving at the time. He emigrated from Germany in 1735, and settled in the Moravian colony in the province of Georgia in what is present-day Savannah.

From there, he traveled to the Province of Pennsylvania in 1741, where he initially settled in Nazareth, Pennsylvania and helped to found the Lehigh Valley community of Bethlehem.

1755 map showing the Shamokin village (center, upper right)

In 1742, Mack then also helped to initiate the first mission in Pennsylvania to the Native American trading village of Shamokin. Located near what, today, is the city of Sunbury, the village, which was also known by the Iroquois name of Otzinachson, had been established as early as 1711, and possibly even before that. By the late 1720s, Shamokin had become one of the most powerful Indian communities in Pennsylvania.

Mack and his wife, Jeannette, became the first Moravian missionaries to take up residency in the Shamokin village, living there for four months beginning in 1745. Their letters and diary entries portray their time as one of "constant danger."

Mack also subsequently helped establish the Lehigh Valley communities of Gnadenhütten and Nain.

A missionary to the Indian people in the region, Mack traveled for twenty years throughout Pennsylvania, the province of New York and New England before he and other Moravians were accused of being spies of the French, arrested and imprisoned at Milford, Connecticut, and banished from New York. Those charges were subsequently dropped in 1749 when the Parliament of the United Kingdom acknowledged the Moravians to be an established, respected episcopal church, and encouraged their continued missionary efforts.

Mack was subsequently called to the West Indies to serve as the superintendent of Moravian missions in the Danish islands, where he spent the next twenty-two years advocating for enslaved men, women and children on Saint Croix, Saint John and Saint Thomas, where he resided.

In 1770, he returned to Bethlehem, where he was consecrated to the episcopacy on October 18. He then returned to the West Indies, where he continued his missionary work.

He died at the Friedensthal Mission at Saint Croix on 9 June 1784.
