= Fort Halifax =

Fort Halifax may refer to:

- Fort Halifax (Maine)
- Fort Halifax (Pennsylvania)
