= Fort Halifax (Pennsylvania) =

- Dauphin County, Pennsylvania, USA

Site information
- Type: Fort
- Controlled by: Province of Pennsylvania

Location
- Approximate location of Fort Halifax in Pennsylvania
- Coordinates: 40°28′59″N 76°55′59″W

Site history
- Built: 1756
- In use: 1756-1757
- Battles/wars: French and Indian War

Garrison information
- Past commanders: Colonel William Clapham; Captain Nathaniel Miles
- Garrison: 50 men

Pennsylvania Historical Marker
- Designated: 1946

Fort Halifax was a temporary stronghold in northern Dauphin County, Pennsylvania, in use from 1756 to 1757, during the time of the French and Indian War. It was located along the Susquehanna River near the present day borough of Halifax, in what was then the Province of Pennsylvania in colonial-era British America.

== Construction ==
The fort was erected by Col. William Clapham, with the order of Governor Morris, and guarded by a garrison of the Third Battalion of the Pennsylvania Provincial Regiment. Fort Halifax was constructed as a subpost along the Susquehanna River with three other forts, Fort Harris, Fort Hunter, and Fort Augusta. On 5 June, 1756, Clapham marched out of Fort Hunter with five companies of men to proceed north along the Susquehanna River to establish a supply post, which would become Fort Halifax. He picked the site along the Susquehanna due to its proximity to a vast stand of pine timber that could be used for construction and because it was near a water-powered sawmill on Armstrong Creek. In a June 11 letter to Governor Morris, Clapham noted that the site he chose for the fort was suitable in part due to "...the vast Plenty of Pine Timber at Hand, its nearness to Shamokin and a Saw within a Quarter of a Mile." In later correspondence he mentions the complete absence of roads along the river.

The fort was originally named "Camp at Armstrong" until General Morris changed it in 1756. It was a 160 feet (49 m) stockade with four bastions and a surrounding earthwork about 10 feet high. Archaeological excavations in 2021 revealed that the fort’s walls consisted of squared logs that were stacked horizontally.

Clapham left the post in July to start construction of Fort Augusta, leaving 30 men under the command of Captain Nathaniel Miles to complete the fort. Once it was complete, it was guarded by a garrison of 50 men from the Pennsylvania Colonial Militia and for the next 16 months, Fort Halifax served as the chief supply post on the line of communications between the area settlements and Shamokin where Fort Augusta would be built later that same year.

== Meeting with Iroquois leaders ==
1780 map showing Fort Halifax to the left of the center of the page.

On 10 June 1756, Clapham held a conference with Oghaghradisha, an Iroquois chief, at Clapham's military camp. Oghaghradisha presented Clapham with a wampum belt and gave Clapham the Iroquois name "Ugcarumhiunth." He told Clapham that

"The Iroquois living on the North Branch of Sasquehanna have lent me as a representative of the whole, to treat with you and will ratify all my contracts. Brother, they agree to your building a Fort at Shamokin, but are desirous that you should also build a Fort three days journey, in a canoe, higher up, the North Branch, in their country, at a place called "Adjouquay" (present-day Pittston, Pennsylvania). If you agree to my proposals in behalf of my nation, I will return and immediately collect our whole force to be employed in protecting your people while you are building a fort in our country...The land is troubled, and you may justly apprehend danger, but if you will grant our request we will be together, and if any danger happens to you, we will share it with you."

== Abandonment and dismantling ==
In August, 1757, local citizens signed a petition alleging that Fort Halifax was unsuitable for their protection, and requesting the transfer of the garrison to Fort Hunter. They stated that Fort Halifax

"...is a very bad situation, being built beyond two ranges of hills, and nobody living near it, none could be protected by it; that it is no station for batteaux parties, having no command of the channel, which runs close on the western shore, and is besides covered with a large island between the channel and fort, so that numbers of the enemy may even in the daytime, run down the river without being seen by that garrison."

Late in 1757, the garrison at Fort Halifax was transferred back to Fort Hunter where they were considered better positioned for the defense of settlements south of Blue Mountain.

It was dismantled in 1763, having become superfluous at the end of Pontiac's War.

== Archaeological investigations ==
Excavations by staff and students of the PennDOT Highway Archaeological Survey Team, in the area where the fort was believed to have stood, started in 2011-2013 and continued in 2014-2015. Ground penetrating radar was used to identify below-ground features. Part of the surface was plowed to turn up artifacts in hopes of locating a concentration of 18th-century items associated with the fort. Items recovered from the surface include clay tobacco pipes and pipe stems, brass buttons and buckles, fragments of ceramic plates and cups, lead musket balls, gun flints, part of a wooden spoon and a Jew's harp.

In June, 2023 renewed excavations led by archaeologists from Juniata College uncovered stones believed to be part of a barracks hearth, arrow points, musket balls, a bone die, a watch winding key, a copper button, and fragments of hand-painted Delft pottery from Europe. Excavations are expected to continue in 2024.

== Memorialization ==
A stone monument, erected in 1926, is located along Pennsylvania Route 147 north of Halifax along Armstrong Creek. A historical marker was erected in 1946 by the Pennsylvania Historical and Museum Commission. The area of the former fort is now part of the Halifax Township Park and Conservation Area, which consists of 174 acres (0.70 km^{2}) bordered on one side by the Susquehanna River and contains a long stretch of Armstrong Creek.

Halifax Township was named in commemoration of the fort.

== See also ==
- List of Forts in the United States
- William Clapham
- Fort Augusta
- Pennsylvania forts in the French and Indian War
