= Northumberland County Historical Society =

Coordinates: 40.875804°N 76.791496°W

- Location: 1150 North Front Street, Sunbury, Pennsylvania 17801
- Type: Historical/Museum/Library
- Key holdings: Artifacts from Fort Augusta and the French and Indian War through the American Revolution; civic and church records from the time of the region's earliest settlers to the present; historic newspapers, vintage photographs, and other items of interest to historians and genealogical researchers
- President: Cindy Inkrote
- Curators: Jack Lindermuth, librarian; (570) 286-4083
- Website: http://www.northumberlandcountyhistoricalsociety.org/

The Northumberland County Historical Society is a Pennsylvania nonproit organization, which was chartered on October 26, 1925 and incorporated on May 21, 1998. Its leaders, members and volunteers are dedicated to the collection, preservation and exhibition of artifacts, documents, photographs, and other items which tell the story of Northumberland County, Pennsylvania and its people.

It has EIN 22-2446050 as a 501(c)(3) Public Charity; in 2023 it claimed $77,995 in total revenue and $1,421,812 in total assets.

Headquartered at the Hunter House Museum at historic Fort Augusta in Pennsylvania's upper Susquehanna Valley, the Historical Society is also home to the Charlotte Darrah Walter Genealogical Library, and presents programs on topics of interest to historians, genealogists and members of the general public at various times during each calendar year. The facilities, which are open from March through December (but closed during the winter months), are physically located at 1150 North Front Street in Sunbury, Pennsylvania.

== Charlotte Darrah Walter Genealogical Library ==
The Charlotte Darrah Walter Genealogical Library houses materials from the time of the region's earliest settlers to the present, including biographical sketches and books published about Northumberland County families; birth, marriage, death, and cemetery records; baptismal, confirmation, burial, and other church records; historic newspapers and vintage photographs; and land deeds, tax rolls, wills, and other county records, etc.

== Hunter House Museum ==
During the early 1930s, the Commonwealth of Pennsylvania took steps to preserve historic Fort Augusta and its surrounding lands through a series of preservation initiatives. Initially purchasing, in 1930, a tract of land where the original powder magazine and well of Fort Augusta were located, state officials then also purchased, in 1931, the historic Hunter House, which had been completed in 1852 by Captain Samuel Hunter, a grandson of Fort Augusta's commandant, Colonel Sam Hunter. Those properties were then acquired by the Northumberland County Historical Society, Inc. from the Pennsylvania Historical and Museum Commission in 2004.

According to historian Margaret Murray Thorell, Ph.D., when the Hunter House became the headquarters for the Northumberland County Historical Society in 1987, "an extensive renovation restored the brick house [Hunter House] to its original 1848 appearance and added meeting space at the rear of the structure."

The holdings at Hunter House Museum include that original powder magazine from Fort Augusta, as well as Native American and Moravian blacksmith artifacts, the uniform and drum of John Boulton Young, a drummer boy who died at the age of 13 while serving with the 47th Pennsylvania Infantry Regiment during the U.S. Civil War, and other items of historic interest which were uncovered during archaeological digs in 1937-1938, 1978-1979, and 1981.

A model of Fort Augusta was built on the front lawn of the Hunter House Museum and dedicated in 2013. It is roughly one-sixth of the size of the original fort, which was built in 1756 to protect settlers during the French and Indian War.

== Education and outreach ==
The society has historically sponsored educational outreach initiatives through an annual series of meetings and other special events. Topics addressed have included:

- The debunking of local and state history myths;
- Displays of period-era uniforms, vehicles, and weapons from the American Civil War and World War II; and
- The impact of the 1918 Spanish influenza on the coal industry in Northumberland County (March 16, 2018)

== Historic preservation ==
In addition to preservation of the Hunter House (see above), society members also collaborate with other organizations to advocate for and ensure the preservation of historic structures across the county. In 2015, society joined with the Old Towne Neighborhood Council in fighting to save the Northumberland County Prison (Pennsylvania), a 139-year-old castle-like structure which had recently been devastated by a major fire.

== Publications ==
Over the years, the Northumberland County Historical Society has partnered with historians and genealogists to produce books, pamphlets and other educational materials, including:

- Carter, John H. The Palatine migration: Schoharie to Tulpehocken. Sunbury, Pennsylvania: Northumberland County Historical Society, 2000;
- Clement, Charles M. The story of early Sunbury and Fort Augusta. Sunbury, Pennsylvania: Northumberland County Historical Society, 1995;
- Gearhart, Heber G. Notable women of Northumberland County. Sunbury, Pennsylvania: Northumberland County Historical Society, 1995;
- Northumberland County in the American Revolution. Sunbury, Pennsylvania: Northumberland County Historical Society, 1976;
- Richardson, Jane DuPree. Over the blue mountain: Pennsylvania-German craft and continuance in the Mahantongo Valley area (1773-1950). Sunbury, Pennsylvania: Northumberland County Historical Society, 2000;
- Snyder, Charles Fisher. Conrad Weiser in the Susquehanna Valley: his travels, land holdings, and the Weiser family in this vicinity. Sunbury, Pennsylvania: Northumberland County Historical Society, 1998, 1934; and
- Ungar, Chuck. Majestic Solitude: Mozart's librettist in Sunbury. Sunbury, Pennsylvania: Northumberland County Historical Society, 1994.

In addition, past editions of NCHS Proceedings, a journal produced by the Northumberland County Historical Society, offer historians and family history researchers the opportunity to explore the region's history from the Native Americans of Shamokin to Early German and Hessian settlers and Revolutionary War and Civil War soldiers, as well as the contributions made by Thomas Edison to the region's development.

== See also ==
- Sunbury, Pennsylvania
- Northumberland County, Pennsylvania
- List of historical societies
- Pennsylvania Federation of Historical Societies

A separate Northumberland County Historical Society (EIN 54-6056907) is based in Heathsville, Virginia.
