= The Bloody Spring =

Sunbury, Pennsylvania historical site

Coordinates: 40°52′31.14″N 76°46′47.22″W

The Bloody Spring is a historical site in the Sunbury, Pennsylvania area. Located on school district property, it is purported to be the location where a soldier from Fort Augusta that was guarding cattle was ambushed and murdered by a Native American tribe member in 1756, during the French and Indian War. His blood is said to have colored the water in the spring red, resulting in the name, The Bloody Spring. The site, located on Memorial Drive and .1 miles south of Shikellamy Avenue, is marked with a historical marker.

== Background ==
Fort Augusta was built that year at the Native American village of Shamokin. In April 1756, the government of Pennsylvania began paying a cash bounty for Indians scalps and prisoners. The Bloody Spring incident occurred in the vicinity of the former village.
