= John F. Cammerhoff =

American missionary

Personal life
- Born: 28 July 1721
- Died: 28 April 1751 (aged 29)
- Education: University of Jena
- Known for: missionary work among Native Americans

Religious life
- Church: Moravian
- Consecration: 25 September 1746

John Frederick Cammerhoff (28 July 1721, in Hillersleben, Germany – 28 April 1751) was a Moravian bishop and missionary.

== Biography ==
He was privately tutored at home, and then attended the school of Kloster Bergen, finally matriculating at the University of Jena. He found Lutheranism not to his taste, and joined the Moravians. When but 25 years of age, he was consecrated a bishop, 25 September 1746, in London, having married Livonian baroness Anna von Pahlen shortly before.

He was sent to America as Bishop Spangenberg's assistant. He began his work with enthusiasm, helping to superintend the churches, going out to preach to the settlers of Pennsylvania and New York, and promoting the mission among Native Americans. He made such an impression upon the aborigines that the Iroquois formally adopted him into the Turtle tribe of the Oneida nation, giving him the name of Gallichwio, or "A Good Message." He frequently visited the Indian country, and gained many converts.

In 1750, in the company of David Zeisberger, he undertook a visit to Onondaga, the capital of the Six Nations, enduring hardships and dangers with the fortitude of an apostle. His journal of this tour, which occupied three months, and embraced a distance of 1,600 miles (2,600 km), is full of startling incidents and hair-breadth escapes. Cammerhoff's physical frame was too weak to bear the strain of such journeys, and he died at the age of 29.

When the Iroquois heard of his death, they mourned for him as for a brother. "He was," they said, "an honest, upright man, in whose heart no guile was found." Thirty-one years later, Zeisberger, apostle of the western Indians, heard his name mentioned among them with deep respect. Cammerhoff was a fine scholar and a powerful orator.
