= Friedensthal Mission =

Mission in Christiansted, US Virgin Islands

- U.S. National Register of Historic Places
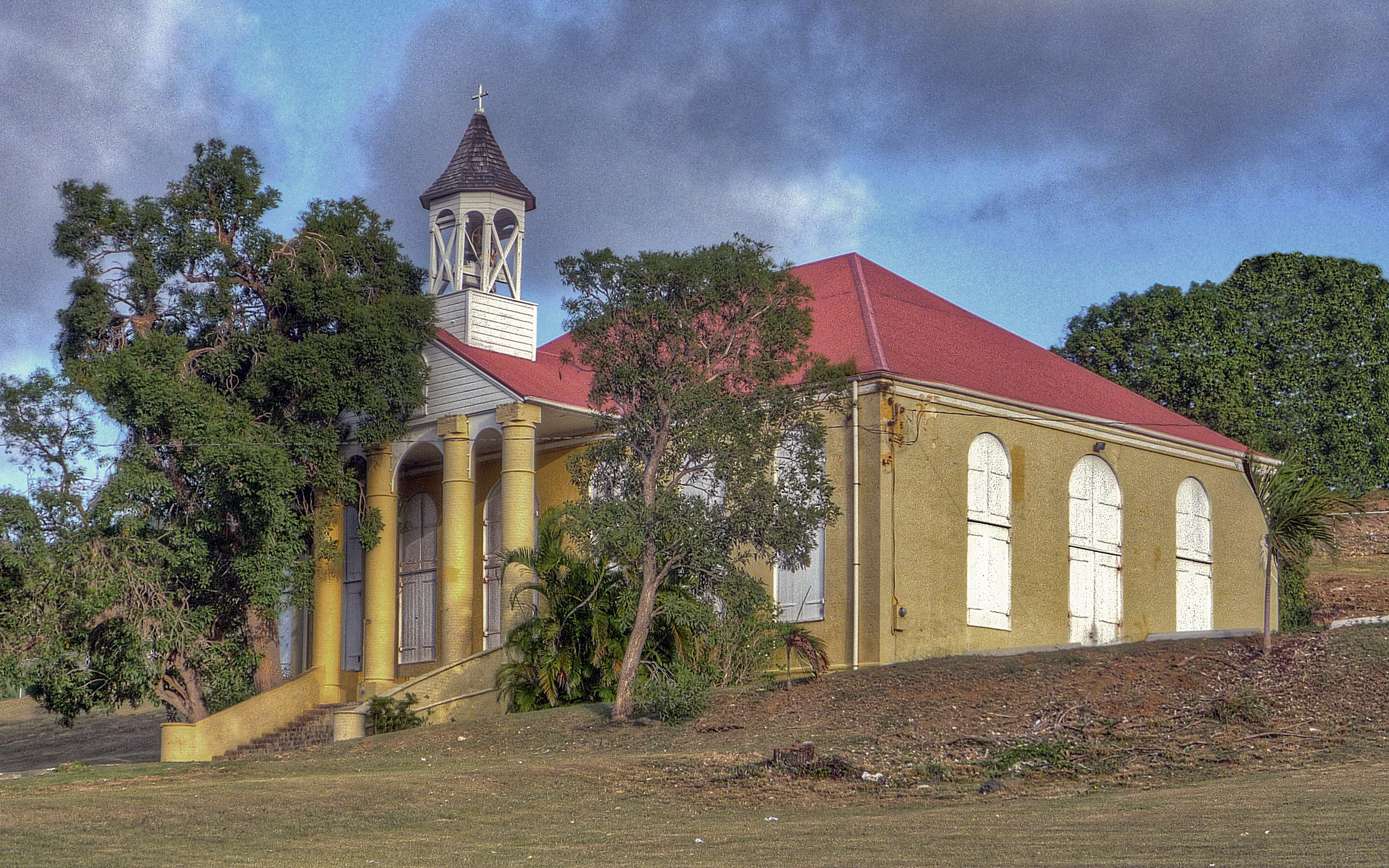

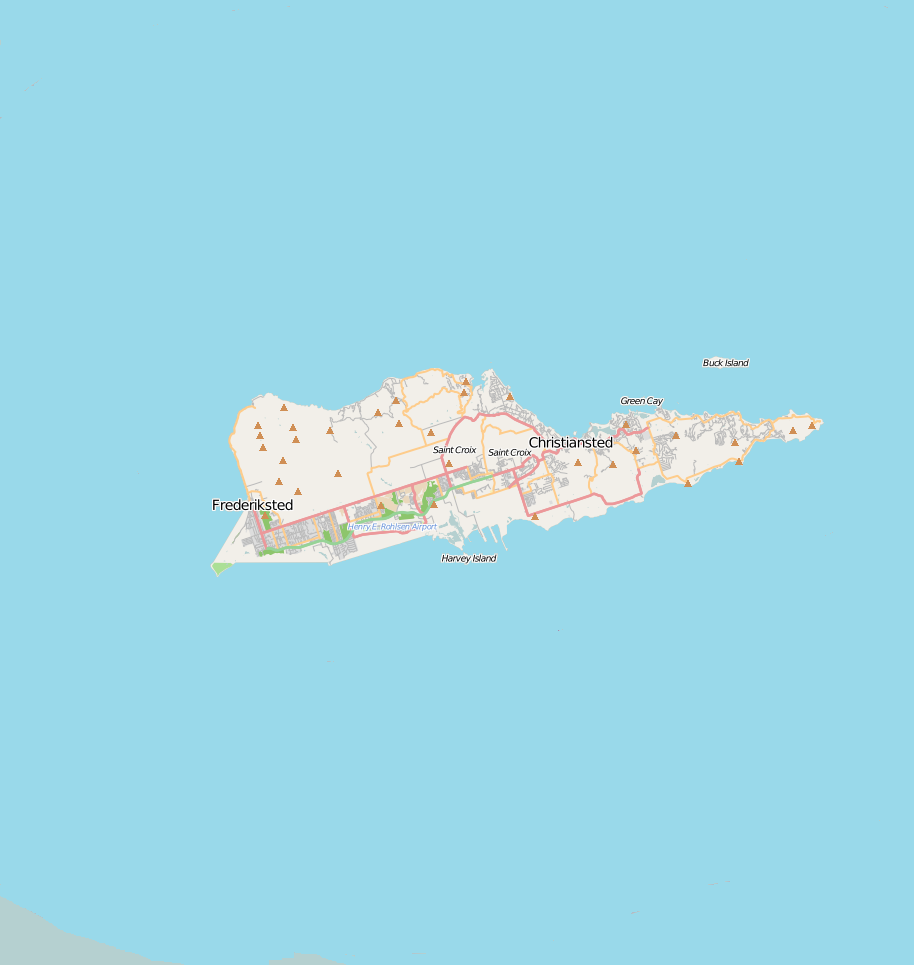
- Location within Saint Croix, US Virgin Islands Location within the U.S. Virgin Islands
- Location: Southwest of Christiansted, Saint Croix, U.S. Virgin Islands
- Coordinates: 17.744028°N 64.709722°W
- Area: 5 acres (2.0 ha)
- Built: c. 1830
- NRHP reference No.: 78002719
- Added to NRHP: August 25, 1978

The Friedensthal Mission, southwest of Christiansted in Saint Croix, U.S. Virgin Islands, was partly built by 1830. Also known as Friedensthal Moravian Church, it was listed on the National Register of Historic Places in 1978. In German, Fridensthal means "valley of peace".

The mission complex is significant as it was one of the first Moravian missions in the Virgin Islands, and it played a role in preparing slaves for emancipation.

The listing included four contributing buildings and two contributing structures on 5 acres (2.0 ha). The mission complex includes a manse (built in 1830) which is 46 by 62.5 feet (14.0 m × 19.1 m) in plan, a church (1852), a slave quarter and kitchen, and a 20th-century schoolhouse.
