= James Burd =

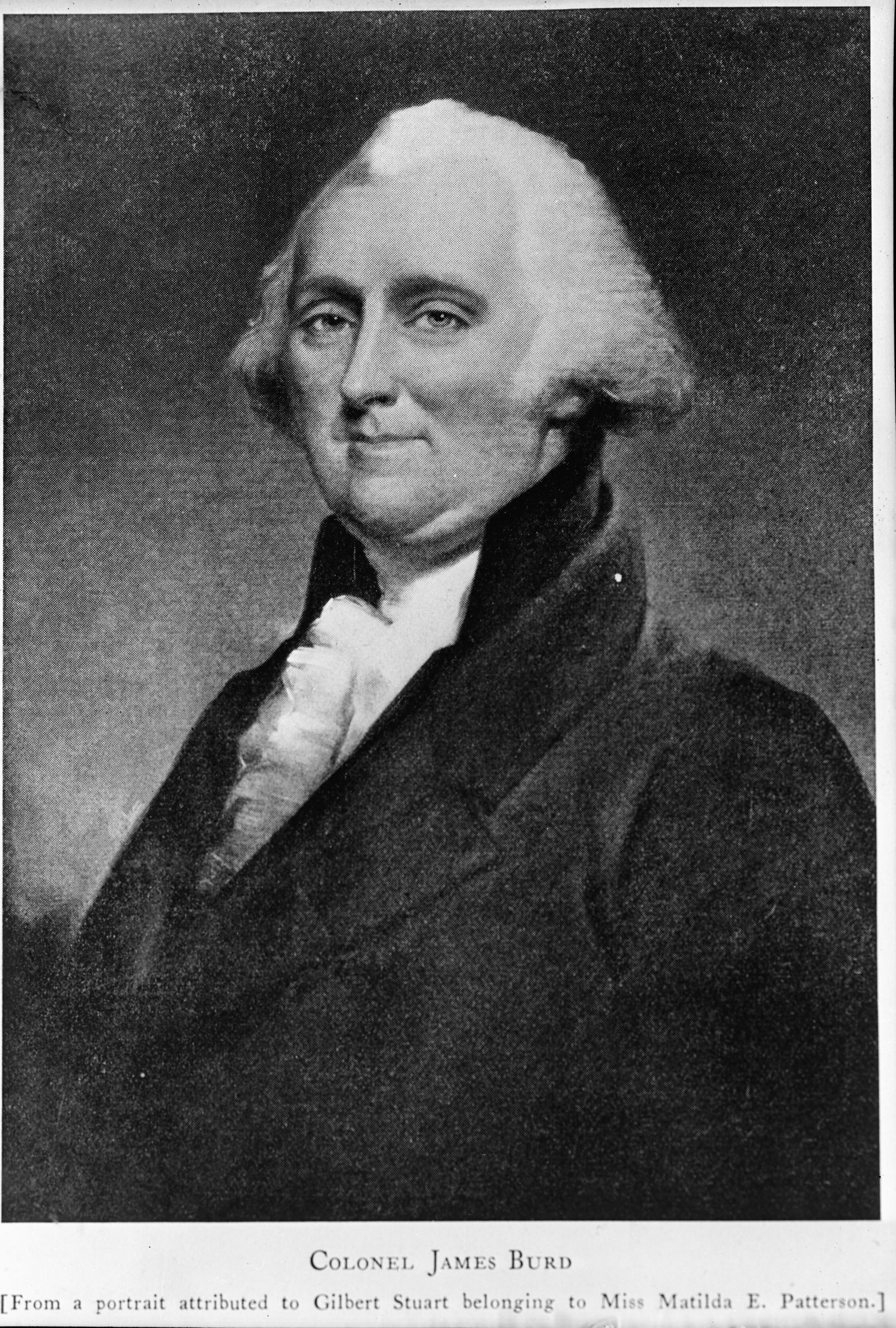
From a portrait of Burd attributed to Gilbert Stuart

James Burd (March 10, 1725 – October 5, 1793) was a colonial American soldier in the French and Indian War, during which he played an important role in fortifying the Pennsylvania frontier.

== Early life ==
Born in Ormiston, near Edinburgh, Scotland, the son of Edward Burd, James Burd came to Philadelphia, Pennsylvania in 1747 or 1748 where he worked as a merchant. On May 14, 1748, he married Sarah Shippen, daughter of former mayor Edward Shippen of the prominent Shippen family of Philadelphia. The couple had eleven children, eight of whom lived to maturity, including Edward Burd.

In 1752, he moved his young family to manage his father-in-law's vast land holdings in the area now known as Shippensburg. In August 1755, his father-in-law asked him to build Fort Morris in Shippensburg.

== Seven Years' War ==
In 1756, he settled on a farm in Lancaster County, Pennsylvania, but soon joined the military as an officer at the outbreak of the French and Indian War. He was commissioned a major at Fort Augusta (at present-day Sunbury, Pennsylvania) in 1756, and on December 8, 1756, after the resignation of Lt. Col. William Clapham, he took command of the fort. Under his command the fort's construction was completed, as well as the Provincial Road between the fort and Tulpehocken, the location of Conrad Weiser's homestead (near present-day Reading).

In 1758, Burd was promoted to colonel. He went with General John Forbes on the Duquesne Expedition under Colonel Henry Bouquet, and 360 of the 400-man garrison participated in the expedition, leaving 40 men at Fort Augusta. During that campaign, Burd contributed to the construction of Fort Ligonier. After the fall of Fort Duquesne, Burd was sent to the Erie area, where he supervised the construction of roads and fortifications.

Most importantly, upon his return from the Great Lakes region he oversaw the erection, with Joseph Shippen, of Fort Burd (later confusedly called Redstone Old Fort due to its proximity to the Monongahela River tributary Redstone Creek). The confusion comes from its being mistaken for a fort associated with the name "Hangard" which French and Native American forces burned repeatedly. Burd felt ill-advised to repeat the blunder, and directed his engineer, instead, to erect the bastion fort on a high bluff overlooking both the Monongahela River and Dunlap's Creek. From this site, at the Western terminus of Nemacolin Trail would develop Brownsville, Pennsylvania, and this former trading Post would grow to serve as a historic depot for river transport to Fort Pitt during the war and as the settlement expanded came to build many of the keel boats and later, steam boats that transported settlers to the Northwest Territory, Ohio Country and via the Missouri Valley, the far west and the Oregon Country. He returned to Fort Augusta in 1760, where he remained until the dissolution of the Pennsylvania Regiment.

From 1764 to 1770 he held the office of Justice of Lancaster County.

In 1774, a year before the outbreak of hostilities with Great Britain, Burd was instrumental in garnering local support for the colonial congress in its opposition to the Crown, and by the following year he was assisting in the military organization of Lancaster County as a member of the Committee of Safety. His direct military involvement in the Revolutionary War was brief, however, as he resigned his post in December 1776 because of a dispute concerning rank and insubordination in his command and some criticism from the Committee of Safety. He retired to civilian life, as a county judge.

He died at "Tinian", his farm near Highspire, Dauphin County, Pennsylvania, on October 5, 1793. He and his wife (d. September 17, 1784) are buried near the entrance in the Old Presbyterian Cemetery in Middletown, Pennsylvania.
