= Fort Augusta =

Stronghold in Northumberland County, Pennsylvania

- Sunbury, Pennsylvania, Northumberland County, Pennsylvania, USA

Site information
- Type: Fort
- Controlled by: Northumberland County Historical Society

Location
- Location of Fort Augusta in Pennsylvania
- Coordinates: 40.8757°N 76.7920°W

Site history
- Built: 1756
- In use: 1756-1780
- Battles/wars: French and Indian War; American Revolutionary War

Garrison information
- Past commanders: Colonel William Clapham; Colonel James Burd; Colonel Samuel Hunter
- Garrison: 16 officers and 337 men

Pennsylvania Historical Marker
- Designated: 1948

Fort Augusta was a stronghold in Northumberland County, Pennsylvania, in the upper Susquehanna Valley from the time of the French and Indian War to the close of the American Revolution. At the time, it was the largest British fort in Pennsylvania, with earthen walls more than two hundred feet long topped by wooden fortifications. With a garrison of over 300 troops and walls specially constructed to resist artillery, it presented a formidable defense and was never attacked. It served as a refuge for local settlers during the French and Indian War and during the American Revolutionary War. It was abandoned in 1780 and dismantled in 1796.

== History ==
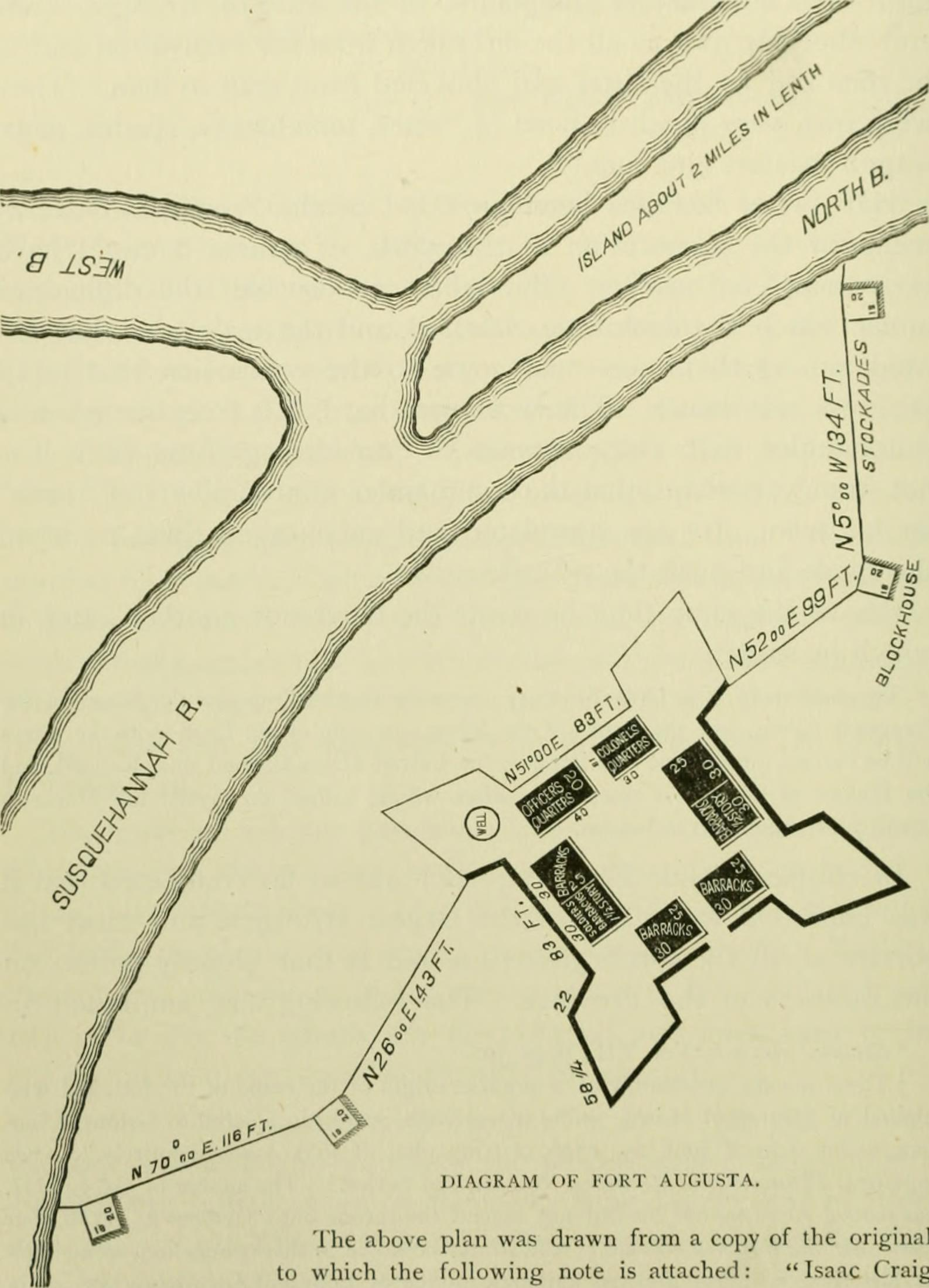
Plan of Fort Augusta on the east bank of the Susquehanna River as it was laid out on June 25, 1756 at the former location of Shamokin

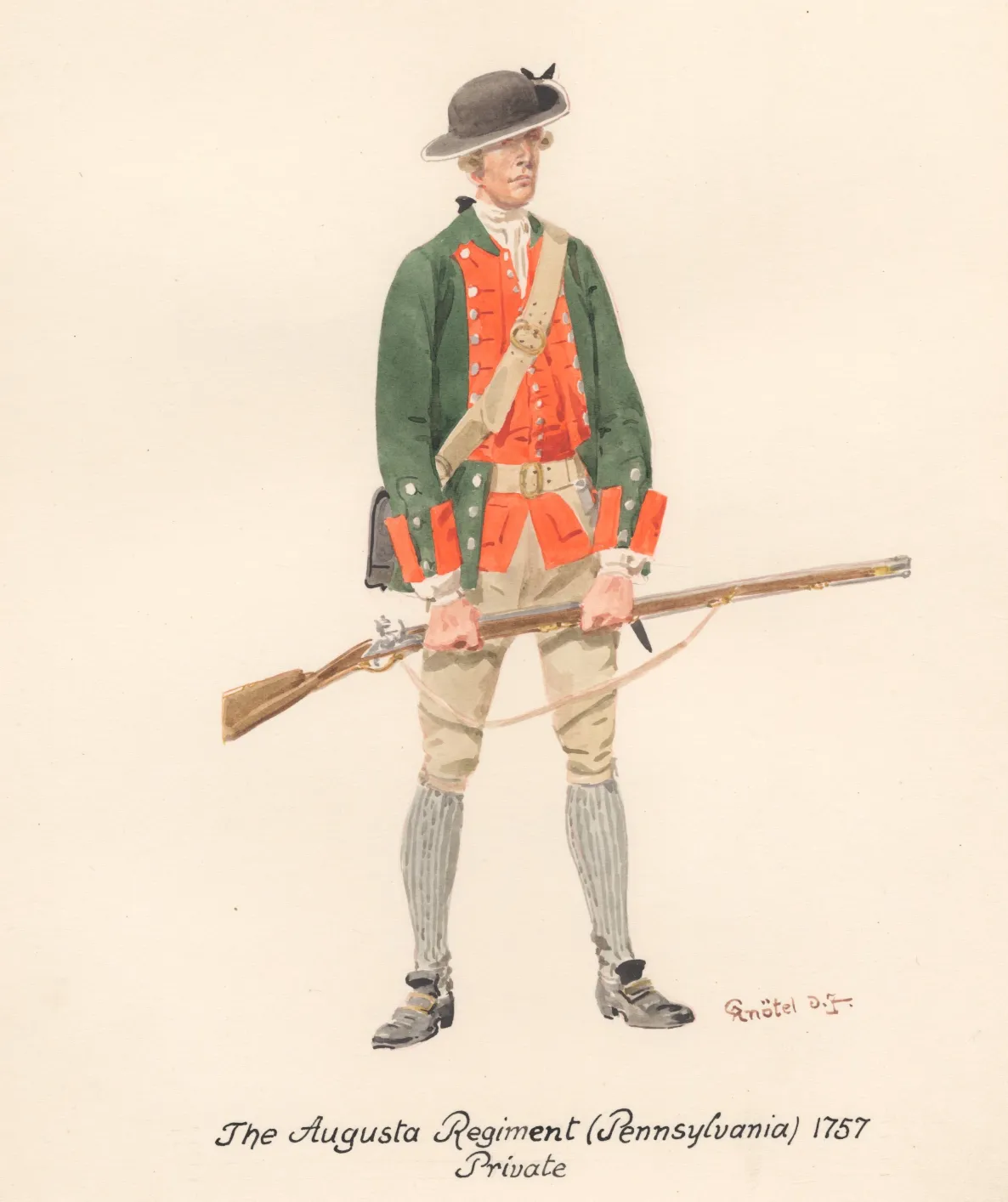
Illustration of an Augusta Regiment private in 1757

=== Construction ===
The fort was erected by Colonel William Clapham in 1756 at a site now within the limits of the city of Sunbury, on the site of the Lenape village of Shamokin, which was abandoned only a few weeks before construction of the fort began. Named for Augusta of Saxe-Gotha, the mother of King George III, Fort Augusta was the largest of the provincial forts. It was first constructed as part of the British defense against French and Indian raids from the upper Allegheny region. The fort was positioned so as to prevent Native American war parties from descending the Susquehanna River, to serve as a refuge for civilians under attack, and as a staging area for military expeditions against enemy forces. Later, it served as an American fortress to aid in protecting settlers of the upper Susquehanna from Britain's Indian allies to the north.

The plan of the fort had been previously drawn up by Governor Robert Hunter Morris, who wrote to Clapham on 12 June recommending "a square with one ravelin to protect the curtain where the gate is, with a ditch, covered way, and glacis." In early July, Clapham marched with his troops from Fort Halifax, while eighteen canoes and bateaux carried supplies downriver, encountering numerous falls and rapids which hindered their progress. On 14 August, Clapham wrote to Governor Morris: "We have the walls of the fort now above-half finished and our other works in such situation that we can make a very good defense against any body of French and Indians that shall seat themselves before us without cannon."

Clapham had largely completed Fort Augusta by late August. It was the largest British fort built in Pennsylvania, with earthen walls more than two hundred feet long topped by wooden fortifications. Buildings included a bakery, smoke house, beef cistern, pork cistern, and a powder magazine with an underground powder keg. The wall facing the river was composed of upright logs, and the rear wall was made up of lengthwise logs. Beyond the main wall was a dry moat that was half as deep as the wall was high. In front of the main gate, a small bridge over the moat could be raised in the event of an attack. Triangular bastions on each corner permitted a crossfire covering the entire extent of the wall. A well was located in the westernmost bastion. Blockhouses connected by a stockade formed a covered way to the river. Clapham took particular care to reinforce the fort's main walls so that they would resist artillery.

The fort was garrisoned by sixteen officers and 337 men and had twelve cannons and two swivel guns. It served as a base for the Third Battalion, Pennsylvania Regiment of Foot, known as the Augusta Regiment, which was originally formed to build and garrison Fort Augusta. Modifications and improvements continued to be made for months, and in late October, Clapham described the final stages of the fort's construction: "In eight or ten days more the ditch will be carried quite around the parapet, the barrier gates finished and erected, and the pickets of the glacis completed." Construction of the fort was completed in 1757 under the command of Colonel James Burd.

A description of the fort is written on the back of the plan of Fort Augusta in the Pennsylvania Archives:

"Fort Augusta stands at about forty yards distance from the river, on a bank twenty-four feet from the surface of the water; that side of the fort...which fronts the river, is a strong palisado, the bases of the logs being sunk four feet into the earth...They are squared--some of the lower ends three feet in diameter...and are mostly white oak. There are six cannon mounted, one in...each bastion fronting the river, and one in...the flank of each of the opposite bastions; the woods cleared to a distance of three hundred yards."

=== French and Indian War ===
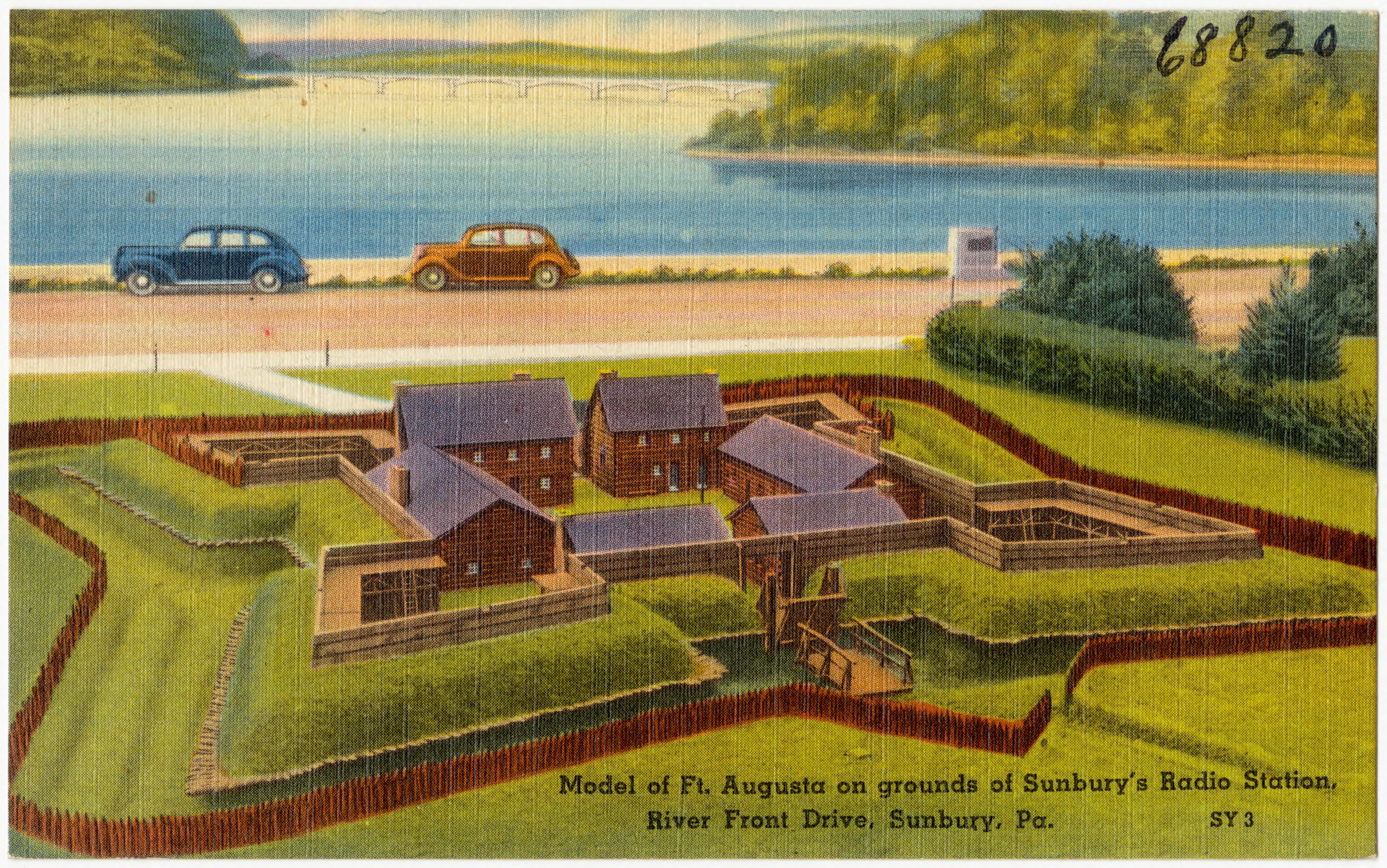
Model of Fort Augusta in 1939

During the French and Indian War in 1756, several hundred French and Indian troops traveled the Great Shamokin Path in an effort to destroy Fort Augusta, the main British stronghold at the junction of the East and West branches of the Susquehanna River. This army was gathered from the French posts at Duquesne, Kittanning, Venango and Le Boeuf and assembled at the mouth of Anderson Creek, near the present location of Curwensville, Clearfield County, Pennsylvania. Here, crude boats, rafts and bateaux were constructed for passage down the Susquehanna River for the proposed attack. They dragged along with them two small brass cannon, but after reconnoitering found the distance too great for the guns to shoot from the hill opposite the fort, and the attack was abandoned. A British defeat at Fort Augusta would have altered the course of the French and Indian War.

The fort saw no action during Pontiac's War, which was fought in the Great Lakes region, and the garrison was evacuated in June, 1765. An Indian trading post, opened in May 1758, remained in operation.

=== American Revolutionary War ===
During the American Revolutionary War, Fort Augusta became the headquarters of the military department of the upper Susquehanna, 1778-1780. Following the Battle of Wyoming on 3 July 1778, Indian raids killed or captured nearly a fifth of the soldiers in local forts, and over three thousand settlers across the West Branch Susquehanna Valley fled to Fort Augusta in a mass exodus known as "the Great Runaway." The fort at that time had a garrison of fewer than one hundred troops, and Colonel Samuel Hunter, the commander, made an urgent plea for reinforcements. Congress ordered eight hundred and fifty militia to defend the fort.

=== Abandonment and dismantling ===
A 1780 map showing Fort Augusta above and to the left of the center of the page.

After 1780, the fort was abandoned, although the colonel's residence was occupied until 1784 by the fort's last commander, Colonel Samuel Hunter (1732-1784), who died there and was buried nearby. The fort was dismantled in 1796, except for the colonel's residence, where Colonel Hunter's family lived until 1848, when it was burned down by a disgruntled servant.

== Archaeology ==
A Works Progress Administration (WPA) investigation of the fort was conducted in 1938, however the excavation records have been lost. Excavations in 1978-1979 uncovered portions of the palisade wall and the dry moat, and 18th-century artifacts such as animal bones, musket balls, gun parts, buttons, cannon balls, and colonial ceramics as well as older Indian objects were recovered.

Investigations in 1981, 1992, and 2005-2006 defined and located parts of structures mentioned in historic documents, including the probable location of the fort’s northeast bastion. Excavations in this area uncovered the remains of a log footer, the dry moat, and various military artifacts.

Excavations in 1992 concentrated on the powder magazine, a 10-foot by 12-foot underground brick-lined storage area built in 1758, which was repaired. During the mid-19th century, a wooden building stood over the underground chamber and at one time it was enlarged and strengthened to serve as the first jail in Northumberland County.

== Hunter House Museum ==
Today, on the site of the old fort, the Northumberland County Historical Society has its headquarters in the Hunter House Museum in Sunbury, Pennsylvania. The museum contains historical and archaeological artifacts dealing with Fort Augusta and items of local history. It also contains Fort Augusta's well and the original powder magazine, as well as a genealogical library of material on early families in Northumberland County and surrounding counties. A model of the fort, built in 2013, stands in the front of the museum as a replica of the original model, which was built in 1939, and taken down in 1974. The model of the fort was reconstructed and rededicated on 10 November 2013.

== See also ==
- List of forts in the United States
- William Clapham
- Pennsylvania forts in the French and Indian War
