= Armstrong Creek (Pennsylvania) =

River in Pennsylvania, United States

Coordinates: 40°28′57″N 76°56′02″W

Armstrong Creek is a 16.5-mile-long (26.6 km) tributary of the Susquehanna River in Pennsylvania in the United States.

The creek rises on Berry Mountain east of Elizabethville and flows generally southwest.

Armstrong Creek joins the Susquehanna River on the north side of Halifax.

Armstong Creek was named for John Armstrong, Sr., who led the Kittanning Expedition in the French and Indian War.

== See also ==
- List of Pennsylvania rivers
