= August Gottlieb Spangenberg =

German theologian and minister; bishop of the Moravian Brethren

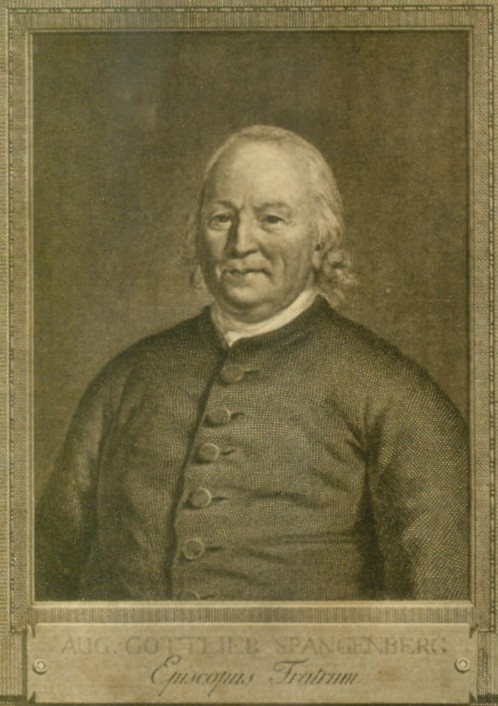
An early 19th century engraving of Spangenberg by Johann Gotthard von Müller

August Gottlieb Spangenberg (15 July 1704 – 18 September 1792) was a German theologian, minister, and bishop of the Moravian Church. As successor to Nicolaus Zinzendorf as bishop of the Moravian Church, he helped develop and lead international Moravian missions in colonial-era Province of Pennsylvania and stabilized Moravian theology and organization.

== Early life and education ==
Spangenberg was born on 15 July 1704, in Klettenberg, Holy Roman Empire, in present-day Hohenstein, Thuringia, Germany. His father, Georg Spangenberg, was a pastor and ecclesiastical inspector. At age 13, Spangenberg left an orphanage to attend the secondary school in Ilfeld.

In 1722, he entered the University of Jena, where he studied law. Johann Franz Buddeus, a professor, took him into his family and arranged a scholarship. Spangenberg soon abandoned law for theology, obtaining his degree in 1726 and began giving free lectures on theology.

== Career ==
Spangenberg took an active part in a religious union of students, supporting free schools for poor children established in the suburbs of Jena and in training teachers.

In 1728, Count Nicolaus Zinzendorf visited Jena, and Spangenberg met him. In 1730, Spangenberg visited the Moravian colony at Herrnhut and founded a "collegium pastorale practicum" for the care of the sick and poor at Jena, which the authorities broke up as a "Zinzendorfian institution", seen as a challenge to the state. Spangenberg visited the Moravian colony, whose approach appealed to him.

His free lectures in Jena were widely accepted. Gotthilf Francke offered him the post of assistant professor of theology and superintendent of schools connected with his orphanage at Halle. He accepted the offer in September 1732. But differences between the pietists of Halle and Spangenberg emerged with Sangenberg finding their religious life too formal, external, and worldly. The pietists could not sanction his comparative indifference to doctrine and his tendency to separatism in church life.

Spangenberg's decision to take part in private observances of the Lord's Supper and his connection with Count Zinzendorf brought matters to a crisis. The Senate of the Theological Faculty gave him the alternative of doing penance, submitting to his superiors, and separating from Zinzendorf, or leaving the issue to be settled by the king unless he preferred to "leave Halle quietly." The case went to the king, who ordered the military to expel Spangenberg from Halle, which they did on April 8, 1733.

At first Spangenberg went to Jena, but Zinzendorf sought to secure him as a fellow labourer, though the count wished to obtain from him a declaration which would remove from the Pietists of Halle all blame with regard to the disruption. Spangenberg went to Herrnhut and found his life work with the Moravian Church, becoming its primary theologian, apologist, statesman, and corrector over a lengthy 60-year career. The Moravians universally referred to Spangenberg as "Brother Joseph" because, like Joseph in Genesis, he took care of his Brethren.

For the first thirty years of his career, from 1733 to 1762, his work was mainly devoted to the supervision and organization of the extensive missions in Germany, England, Denmark, the Netherlands, Suriname, and elsewhere.

One of Spangenberg's special endeavors was in the Province of Pennsylvania in what was then colonial-era British America, where he brought the scattered followers of Caspar Schwenckfeld into the Moravian faith. In 1741 and 1742, he traveled to England to raise funds for his mission and obtain the sanction of the Archbishop of Canterbury.

During the second half of this missionary period of his life, Spangenberg served as the Moravian Church's bishop in Pennsylvania, where he oversaw its Moravian churches. He helped raise money to defend the Thirteen Colonies during the Seven Years' War, and wrote as an apologist of the Moravian Church against criticism from Lutherans and Pietism. He moderated the mysticism of Zinzendorf, bringing a simple, practical nature to his theological work.

In 1761, Spangenberg visited Emmaus, Pennsylvania, then one of the four leading Moravian communities in the Thirteen Colonies, and announced the town's new name as Emmaus, "Now here we build a village small; toward its completion we give all. Here, too, our hearts within shall flame; Emmaus then shall be its name.".

The second thirty years of his work between 1762 and 1792 were largely devoted to the consolidation of the German Moravian Church. Following Zinzendorf's death in 1760, he returned to Herrnhut, where the Moravian organization needed help.

In 1777, Spangenberg was commissioned to draw up the Idea Fidei Fratrum, a compendium of the Christian faith of the United Brethren, which became the accepted declaration of the Moravian belief. Compared to Zinzendorf's writings, his book exhibited the balance and moderation that Spangenberg expressed.

The Idea Fidei Fratrum is an account of doctrine that keeps close to the words of Scripture. There is little in it of abstract theological reasoning. Spangenberg does make his views plain on certain controversial matters. One of these, for instance, is the question of double predestination, including damnation and salvation, about which he wrote:

"If we sum up that which hath been deduced from the Scripture concerning the Father, Son and Holy Ghost, we may answer the question, Whether God would have all men to be saved? with a confident, Yes. There is in him the most fervent desire, and the most earnest will that we all should be saved."

He provided several texts to justify this position, writing that Jesus suffered the loss of glory and the pains of human life and death in order to save all people. The Holy Ghost, he argued, makes unwearyingly efforts to reprove the worldly for their sin, writing, "Would God command all men every where to repent, and yet would not, that all men should be saved? Who can form such a thought of the God of Holiness and Truth?"

In the final years of his, Spangenberg devoted special attention to the education of the young.

== Death ==
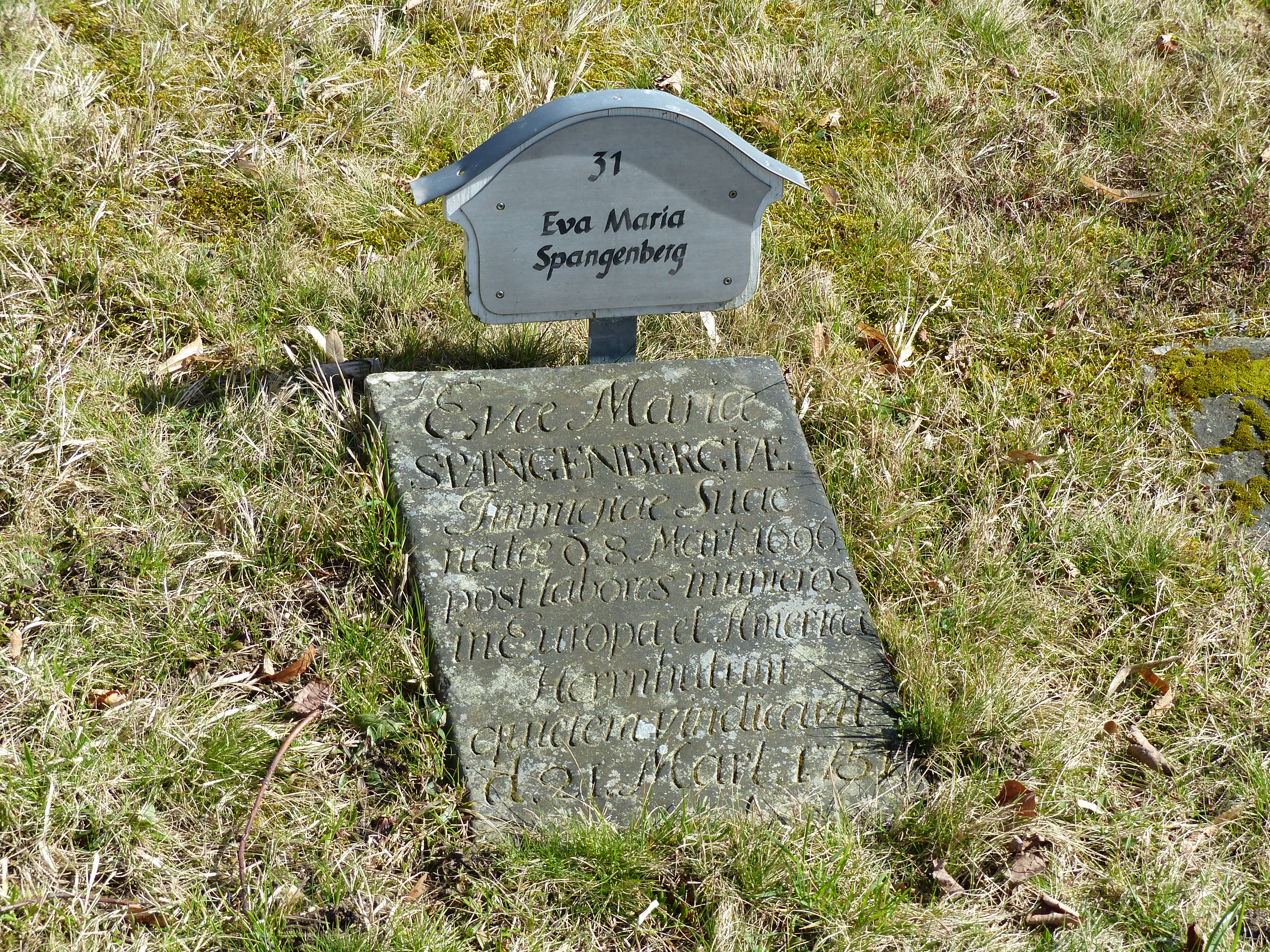
Spangenberg's gravesite in God's Acre in Herrnhut, Germany

Spangenberg died at Berthelsdorf on September 18, 1792, and was buried in God's Acre in Herrnhut.

== Works ==
- Idea fidei fratrum (Barby, 1782; translated into English by La Trobe under the title Exposition of Christian Doctrine, London, 1784)
- Declaration über die seither gegen uns ausgegangenen Beschuldigungen sonderlich die Person unseres Ordinarius (Zinzendorf) betreffend, a polemical work in defence of Zinzendorf (Leipzig, 1751)
- Apologetische Schlußschrift, a polemical work in defence of Zinzendorf (1752)
- Leben des Grafen Zinzendorf (3 vols., Barby, 1772-1774; abridged English translation, London, 1838)
- numerous hymns.
