= Neucheconeh =

18th-century Shawnee Indian chief

Neucheconeh (various spellings)
- Born: probably Pennsylvania
- Died: after 1752 probably Ohio
- Years active: 1732–1748
- Known for: Promoting peaceful coexistence with English colonists, opposition to the sale of alcohol to Native Americans
- Title: Chief of the Western Pennsylvania Shawnee

Neucheconeh (Note: Variously spelled as Newcheconner, Nocheknonee, Neucheconner, Neucheconno, Neucheconer, Nowchekano, Nawchikana, Neuchconna, Nuckegunnah, Neuchyconer or Nechikonner) (fl. 1732–1748) was a Pekowi Shawnee chief from western Pennsylvania. From 1732 to 1745, Neucheconeh shared leadership of the Shawnee of western Pennsylvania with Kakowatcheky. During that time, he petitioned the Pennsylvania Provincial Government to regulate the sale of alcohol in Shawnee communities and was involved in the migration of many Shawnees into the Ohio River Valley, away from the influence of European settlers and into a region where game was more plentiful. In 1745 he joined Peter Chartier and other Shawnees who chose loyalty to New France, but after three years he returned to Pennsylvania and apologized. His date and place of death are unknown.

== Letter to Governor Gordon, 1732 ==
Like many Native American leaders of that time, Neucheconeh's life is only known through colonial documents, treaties and letters, as the Shawnee did not keep written records until later. His name (Noochickoneh) first appears as a chief's signature to a letter to Governor Patrick Gordon in June 1732, sent in explanation for the sudden move of Shawnees from Pechoquealin (now Smithfield Township, Monroe County, Pennsylvania) to Wyomink in August, 1728. The move was so sudden that the Shawnees did not take the time to harvest their cornfields. At the time, Neucheconeh was described as "chief of the Shawnees at Allegheny." The letter states that the Five Nations proposed that the Shawnees join them in attacking English settlements, saying, "Our land is going to be taken from us. Come, brothers, assist us. Let us fall upon and fight with the English." The Shawnee refused, and the Five Nations advised them to relocate to Wyomink, adding that the Haudenosaunee would "look upon you as women for the future, and not as men," and that the Shawnee should "look back toward Ohio, the place from whence you came; and return thitherward." The letter also notes: "One reason of our leaving our former settlements and coming here is, several negro slaves used to run away and come amongst us; and we thought ye English would blame us for it." Starting in 1728 many Shawnees began migrating into the Ohio Valley.

== Petition, 1734 ==
In 1734 the Provincial Council received a letter dated May 1 from "Nechikonner" and other Shawnees living in "Allegania," responding to Pennsylvania's repeated requests that the Shawnees return to the Susquehanna Valley. The letter complained about certain traders who sold rum to the Shawnees, and they requested that these men be "kept particularly" from trading amongst the Shawnees. They then endorsed several traders whom "we desire may have Licence to come and trade with us, as also Peter Cheartier, who we reckon one of us, and he is welcome to come as long as he pleases." They also petitioned that "no trader above-mentioned may be allowed to bring more than 30 Gallons of Rum, twice in a year and no more," as excessive drinking was starting to have social and economic effects on the Shawnee people.

== Temperance pledge, 1738 ==
Neucheconeh's name was signed to another letter of March 20, 1738, addressed to Thomas Penn and Acting Governor James Logan, which stated:

All our people being gathered together, we held a council together, to leave off drinking for the space of four years, and we all in general agreed to it, taking into consideration the ill consequences that attend it and what disturbance it makes, and that two of our brothers, the Mingoes, lost their lives in our towns by rum, and that we would live in peace and quietness and become another people ... The proposal of stopping the rum and all strong liquors was made to the rest [of the tribe] in the winter, and they were all willing. As soon as it was concluded of, all the rum that was in the Towns was all staved and spilled, belonging both to Indians and white people, which in quantity consisted of about forty gallons, that was thrown in the street, and we have appointed four men to stave all the rum or strong liquors that is brought to the Towns hereafter, either by Indians or white men, during the four years. We would be glad if our brothers would send strict orders that we might prevent the rum coming to the hunting cabins or to the neighboring towns. We have sent wampum to the French, to the Five Nations, to the Delaware ... to tell them not to bring any rum to our towns, for we want none ... so we would be glad if our brothers would inform the traders not bring any for we are sorry, after they have brought it a great way, for them to have it broke, and when they're once warned they will take care.

This letter was accompanied by a pledge, signed by ninety-eight Shawnees and by Chartier, agreeing that all rum should be spilled, and four men should be appointed for every town to see that no rum or strong liquor should be brought into their towns for the term of four years. Neucheconeh signed as "Newcheconneh, Deputy King," after the signature of "Loyparcowah, Opehassah's Son." He was apparently acting as vice-regent for the heir of Opessa, the chief of the Shawnees at Conestoga. Neucheconeh shared leadership of the Pennsylvania Shawnee with Kakowatcheky until 1745.

== Treaty with Thomas Penn, 1739 ==
On 27 July 1739, Cacowatchike (Kakowatcheky), Newcheconneh, Tamenebuck, and Meshemethequater came to Philadelphia from Wyoming and Allegheny to hold a council with Governor Thomas Penn. Colonial authorities were concerned about the migration of Shawnee and Lenape communities from Pennsylvania to the Ohio River valley, where it was feared that they would become allies of New France. Population pressure from increasing numbers of European colonists had reduced the availability of game for hunting, creating problems for the Indian populations which subsisted largely on game during the winter months. This westward shift of Shawnee communities led to the migration of many to the Ohio River Valley. Secretary James Logan told the Shawnee,

Since your nation first left their settlement near Paxtang, on the west side of the Susquehanna, and retired to so great a distance as the River Ohio, or Allegheny, this Government has ever been desirous of a conference with some of your chiefs. Some of your older men may undoubtedly remember that about forty years ago a considerable number of families of your nation thought it fit to remove from the great river that bears your name, where your principal correspondence was with those of the French nation.

A new treaty was concluded at this council, in which it was declared that the Shawnees had moved to the Allegheny from their former home on the Susquehanna. This treaty was signed on behalf of the Shawnees on the Juniata River and Susquehanna River by Kaycowockewr (Kakowatcheky), chief of those at Wyoming Valley, and by Newcheconner and Tomenebuck, for the Shawnees of Allegheny.

== Peace negotiations, 1743 ==
After a series of violent conflicts between Indians and white settlers, Meshemethequater and other chiefs from the Six Nations (including Shikellamy), the Tuscaroras, and the Lenape met with Conrad Weiser and Andrew Montour at Shamokin in April 1743, and received wampum from Weiser, who was trying to persuade the Shawnees not to attack English traders living on the Allegheny, to prevent war from erupting. When the Council at Shamokin came to consider the messages sent by Weiser to the Shawnees, "then the speaker, in behalf of Cachawatsiky [Kakowatcheky] the Shawonese chief at Wyomink, and of Nochecouna [Neucheconeh], the Shawonese chief at Ohio, related their answers to two messages that were sent with some strings of wampum by the Council held at Shamokin [in February 1743]. He began with Neucheconner's answer, directed to the Governor of Pennsylvania:

Brother, the Governor of Pennsylvania: I live upon this River of Ohio, harmless, like a little child. I can do nothing; I am but weak; and I don't so much as intend mischief. I have nothing to say and do; therefore, send these strings of wampum to Kakowatcheky, the chief man, again. He will answer your message, as he is the older and greater man.

Ultimately, the negotiations were successful. Neucheconeh may have indicated deference to Kakowatcheky because he was considering migrating to French-held territory in the Ohio Valley. Conflicts with the English traders on the Allegheny prompted Kakowatcheky himself to move to Logstown in 1744.

== Association with Peter Chartier, 1745-1748 ==
About 1730, the Shawnees from Opessa's Town on the Potomac (now Oldtown, Maryland) moved to the Allegheny, and they were followed during the next four years by most of the Pekowi Shawnees then living in the Cumberland Valley. By 1744 the principal town of the Shawnees on the Ohio was Neucheconeh's Town, also known to the traders as Chartier's Town, because at the time Peter Chartier was the most influential resident trader on the Allegheny. In April 1745, Chartier, annoyed with the Pennsylvania Provincial government's failure to control the sale of rum in Shawnee communities (which was creating serious conflicts and health problems) abandoned Chartier's Town and moved to Lower Shawneetown, taking with him Neucheconeh, Meshemethequater, and about 400 Shawnees. Chartier remained at Lower Shawneetown until late June, then led his band of Shawnees into Kentucky to found the community of Eskippakithiki. In 1747 Neucheconeh accompanied Chartier's band of Shawnees to Tennessee, Alabama and South Carolina.

In the summer of 1748 more than a hundred Shawnees, led by Chartier's cousin Meshemethequater, returned to Pennsylvania. Chartier's defection to the French had caused much concern among the British authorities, as the Provincial government feared that other Shawnee and possibly other tribes would also shift their alliance to the French. In July the Pennsylvania Provincial Council appointed a commission to meet with the Shawnees who had returned. The commission was instructed:

As to the Shawonese you are to enquire very exactly after their conduct since the commencement of the War, and what lengths they went in favor of Peter Chartier; where he is; and what he has been doing all this time; and be careful that these people acknowledge their fault in plain terms, and promise never to be guilty of any behaviour again that may give such reason to suspect their fidelity.

In council with Scarouady on 20 July 1748 Meshemethequater submitted an apology for having joined with Chartier, stating:

Grandfathers and Brethren: We, the Shawonese, have been misled, and have carried on a private correspondence without letting you or our brethren, the English, know of it. We travelled secretly through the bushes to Canada, and the French promised us great things : but we find ourselves deceived. We are sorry that we had anything to do with them. We now find that we could not see, although the sun did shine. We earnestly desire you would intercede with our brethren, the English, for us who are left at Ohio, that we may be permitted to be restored to the chain of friendship, and be looked upon as heretofore, the same flesh with them.

Although Kakowatcheky had not followed Chartier to Ohio, as had Neucheconeh and Meshemethequater, he participated in the apology and was commended by the Provincial authorities for maintaining his loyalty to the British: The Pennsylvania Commissioners agreed to take the offending Shawnees back into the English alliance, but they also sent a belt of wampum by the Six Nations chiefs, requesting them to reprimand Neucheconeh and his party for their misconduct:

Take this string of wampum and therewith chastize Neucheconneh and his party in such terms as will be a proper severity with them. Then tell the delinquent Shawnees that we will forget what is past, and expect a more punctual regard to their engagements hereafter.

In a letter to Conrad Weiser dated 23 June 1748 Anthony Palmer, President of the Pennsylvania Provincial Council, said, "...they relented, made acknowledgment to the Government of their error in being seduced by Peter Chartier, and prayed they might be permitted to return to their old Town."

== Later life and death ==
Neucheconeh's name does not appear in the records after 1752 and it is assumed that he lost influence as a result of his brief association with Peter Chartier. He may have returned to live in Lower Shawneetown. The date and place of his death are unknown.

== See also ==
- Peter Chartier
- Meshemethequater
- Opessa Straight Tail
- Logstown
- Kakowatcheky
