= Sassoonan =

Lenape chief

Sassoonan or Allumapees
- Born: c. 1675; Tulpehocken Creek Valley
- Died: 15 October 1747 (aged c. 72); Shamokin
- Years active: 1715–1744
- Known for: Promoting peaceful coexistence with English colonists
- Predecessor: Skalitchy (aka Gollitchy)
- Successor: Shingas
- Parent: Tamanend (father)

Sassoonan or Allumapees (c. 1675 – 15 October 1747) was a Lenape chief who lived in the colonial-era Province of Pennsylvania in the late 17th and early 18th century. He was known for his negotiations with the provincial government of Pennsylvania in several land purchases. He was a respected leader until political intrigue and migration of the Lenape into the Ohio Country diminished his influence. During his final years he became dependent on alcohol and died in Shamokin in 1747. After his death the Lenape were without a chief until 1752, when the Iroquois leader Tanacharison appointed Shingas to represent them at the Logstown Treaty conference. He was a son of Tamanend, also known as "Tammany," a well-respected Lenape sachem known as a lover of peace and friendship.

After 1728, Sassoonan is often referred to as "Allumapees," (sometimes written "Olumapies," with a variety of other spellings). According to one source, this was actually a title, not a proper name: "Olomipees meant 'preserver of the records,'" and was given to "a head chief of the Delawares." A few sources also refer to him as "Weheequickhon," or "Wikwikhon," although this is disputed and the name may refer to someone else.

== Lenape chief ==
Sassoonan's name first appears in the colonial records on July 25, 1709, when he attended a conference in Philadelphia together with Passakassy, Owechela and Skalitchy, all four of whom were then described as "chiefs of the Delaware Indians settled at Peshtang, above Conestogoe, and other adjacent places." He was with Owechela and Skalitchy at another conference in Philadelphia in July, 1712. The next conference was on 14 June, 1715, when he arrived with the Shawnee chief Opessa Straight Tail (his son-in-law) and met with Deputy Governor Charles Gookin. In the minutes, Sassoonan is reported as saying "that their [the Lenape's] late king, Skalitchy, desired of them that they would take care to keep a perfect peace with ye English." Sassoonan was the head of the Lenape delegation at this conference, and this statement indicates that Sassoonan had become chief after Skalitchy's death between 1712 and 1715.

== Land release of 1718 ==
In late 1718, Sassoonan and several other Lenape chiefs came to Philadelphia claiming that they had not been paid for their lands. James Logan, secretary of the Pennsylvania Provincial Council, showed them, in the presence of the Council, a number of deeds, and convinced Sassoonan and the other Lenape chiefs that they were mistaken. Sassoonan and the six other chiefs then executed a release on 17 September, 1718 acknowledging that their ancestors had received payment from William Penn for all the land. By the same document they released all the land "between the Delaware and the Susquehanna from Duck Creek to the mountains [the South Mountain] on this side of Lechay [by the Lehigh River]." At the time, Sassoonan was still living at Paxtang, but soon after he moved to Shamokin where he remained for the rest of his life.

== Tulpehocken conflict, 1728 ==
At a conference in Philadelphia on 4 June, 1728 Sassoonan complained that the German Palatines (immigrants from Germany) were settling in the Tulpehocken Creek Valley, in Berks and Lebanon counties, which, as he claimed, had not been purchased from the Indians. Governor William Keith had invited a group of German immigrants to move from the Schoharie Valley in New York to Tulpehocken, but the Lenape already living there had objected that they had not given up the rights to that area and wanted payment.

James Logan sympathized at first with the Lenape, whose unfenced corn had been destroyed by the cattle "of these new-comers whom they knew not." He writes: "These poor People were much disturbed at this, yet finding they could no longer raise Corn there for their Bread, they quietly removed up the River Sasquehannah, though not without repining at their hard usage. Not long after, most of their Hunters retired for the Sake of better Game to Ohio."

At the conference, Sassoonan said that he could not have believed that the German colonists had already occupied the land, if he had not gone there and seen the settlements with his own eyes. The minutes of the conference state:

"[Sassoonan] said he was grown old and was troubled to see the Christians settle on lands that the Indians had never been paid for; they had settled on his lands for which he had never received anything. That he is now an old man, and must soon die; that his children may wonder to see all their father's lands gone from them without his receiving anything for them; that the Christians now make their settlements very near them (the Indians); and they shall have no place of their own left to live on; that this may occasion a difference between their children and us, and he would willingly prevent any misunderstanding that may happen."

This conference did not succeed in settling the matter of these settlements in the Tulpehocken Valley. The matter dragged along until 1732, when Sassoonan and six other Lenape chiefs, in consideration of 20 brass kettles, 20 fine guns, 50 tomahawks, 60 pairs of scissors, 24 looking glasses, 20 gallons of rum, and various other articles acceptable to the Indians, handed over the rights to all those lands "situate, lying and being on the River Schuylkill and the branches thereof, between the mountains called Lechaig (Lehigh) to the south, and the hills or mountains, called Keekachtanemin, on the north, and between the branches of the Delaware River on the east, and the waters falling into the Susquehanna River on the west" to John Penn, Thomas Penn, and Richard Penn, proprietors of the Province. James Logan later wrote that Sassoonan complained of the inferior quality of the goods he was given: "He Sayes we have got all his Land, that it is good Land, and he ought to have good Goods for it. He has no more to Sell, and when these Goods are gone...he shall have nothing."

== Death of Shakatawlin, 1731 ==
In July 1731, Sassoonan killed his nephew, Shakatawlin in a drunken brawl. On 2 August, 1731, James Logan wrote to Thomas Penn:

It has most unhappily so faln out, that Opekasset the eldest and next heir died last Spring of the Small pox, and Shachatawlin the truest, honestest young fellow I ever knew amongst the Indians...was lately kill'd by a sudden Stab from the old King Sassoonan's own hand in his liquor, So that none of that family but the unhappy old man who sorrows almost to death of the Accident, is now left for us to treat with.

Both Opekasset and Shakatawlin were important Lenape chiefs and close friends of Sassoonan, and Opekasset had been considered Sassoonan's likely successor as chief. (Note: Jennings speculates that Sassoonan deliberately killed Shakatawlin because, as a protégé of James Logan, he represented a threat to Sassoonan's authority. Shakatawlin's death elevated Pisquetomen to the position of most likely successor to Sassoonan, which Jennings argues was Sassoonan's intent, in order to provide the Lenape with a leader who would stand up to Logan and the Penns.) Sassoonan went into a deep depression, refusing to eat. Thomas Penn and James Logan invited him to spend some time in Philadelphia in August 1731 so they could console and encourage him.

A debate followed on whether the sale of alcohol should be prohibited among the Lenape, as it was causing significant social problems, including an erosion of civility, an increase in violence and widespread health problems. Alcohol made men less reliable hunters and allies, destabilized village economics, and contributed to a rise in poverty. Sassoonan responded to these suggestions by recommending that alcohol be made more difficult to obtain but not altogether forbidden:

It is very true that the Indians have made frequent Complaints of Rum being brought among them in Large Quantities, and that they themselves have too great a liking for it, but that of late very large Quantities are carried everywhere amongst them, that many horse-loads of it pass by his Door and it all comes from Philadelphia, and that he cannot understand why such Quantities should be sent up...That there was not so much danger to be apprehended in the Quantities that the Indians should bring up themselves in this manner, as from the great quantities that are brought amongst them by the white People, and his desire is that no Rum should be suffered to be carried amongst them by the English, but that if the Indians want it, they should be required to come to Philadelphia for it. That the Indians do not desire that rum should be entirely stopt and that none at all should be brought to them; they would have some but not much, and desire none may be brought but by sober good men, who will take a dram with them to refresh them and not so much as to hurt them. The Governor knows there are ill people amongst the Christians as well as amongst them; that what mischief is done he believes is mostly owing to rum, and it should be prevented. He desires that no Christian should carry any rum to Shamokin where he lives, to sell; when they want any, they will send for it themselves; they would not be wholly deprived of it, but they would not have it brought by the Christians. He desires four men may be allowed to carry some rum to Allegheny, to refresh the Indians when they return from hunting, and that no one else be permitted to carry any. They also desire that some rum may be lodged at Tulpyhockin and Pextan, to be sold to them, that their women may not have too long a way to fetch it.

On his visit to Philadelphia in 1731, Sassoonan was accompanied by his nephew Pisquetomen. James Logan immediately disliked him, and when he found out that Pisquetomen was Sassoonan's chosen successor, Logan objected, writing to Thomas Penn: "I concerted measures with Sassoonan, when returned to my house, to have that fellow laid aside and a better substituted in his place, which, 'tis hoped, may take effect."

== Friendship with the colonial authorities ==
By the mid-1730s hundreds of new settlements across Pennsylvania were creating conflicts with the Lenape and Shawnee residents. The clearing of farmland and increased hunting killed and drove off game, leading to hunger among Native American communities that subsisted largely on game during the winter months. Sassoonan wanted to maintain good relations with the colonial government in order to ensure respect for indigenous land rights, but the colonists viewed him as "now become very weak, and the other Old people with him, as well as himself, poor and necessitous," with less influence among his people and thus unlikely to pose a threat to colonial expansion.

Sassoonan was also seeking trade goods to redistribute among his people as a means of maintaining influence among them, as "A younger set of men were coming into power among the Lenape," and more of them were migrating with their families westward into the Ohio Country where hunting was good and there were no English settlements. The Pennsylvania authorities also wanted to keep the Lenape from moving into the Ohio Valley, where they would be more likely to become French allies, therefore Sassoonan was presented with frequent gifts. On a visit to Philadelphia in August, 1736 he was presented with "four strouds, four blankets, four duffels, four shirts, twenty pounds of powder, fifty pounds of lead, one dozen tobacco tongs, one dozen knives, tobacco and pipes, one hundredweight of bread, [and] five gallons of rum." On another visit to Philadelphia in October, 1738 he was given "Six Strowd Matchcoats, Twelve Duffells, Twelve Blankets, six hatts, Four shirts, Fifty Pounds of Powder and as much lead, a Dozen of knives, [and] a Gross of Pipes with Tobacco." Sassoonan visited Philadelphia again in August, 1740, stating "Your young men have killed so many deer, beavers, bears, and game of all sorts that we can hardly find any for ourselves." He was provided with even more generous gifts on this occasion, although instead of rum, he was presented with a horse, saddle and bridle.

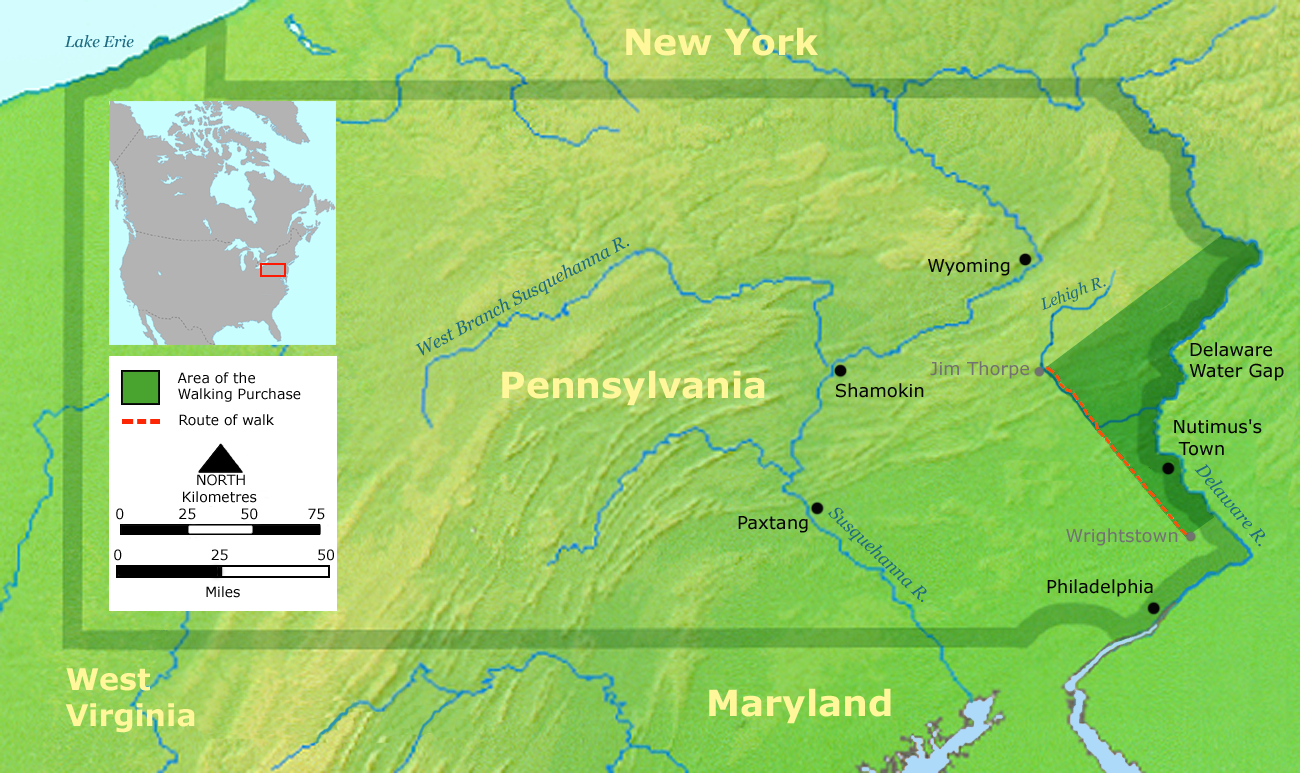
The area acquired by the Penns under the Walking Treaty of 1737, northern Delaware River sources along northeast border between the colonial Province of Pennsylvania and West New Jersey in the Province of New Jersey (shaded)

On 12 July, 1742 Sassoonan attended a conference in Philadelphia, accompanied by Nenatcheehunt, to resolve differences over the occupation of lands ceded under the Walking Purchase of 1737 but which the Lenape were refusing to leave, stating that the purchase had been unfairly negotiated. They "had even declared their intention to maintain possession by force of arms." Present at the conference were 230 Iroquois, whose leader Canassatago rebuked the Lenape, calling them women and ordering them to move westward to "Wyomink or Shamokin" and leave their traditional homeland along the Delaware River, adding: "We charge You to remove instantly. We don't give you the liberty to think about it...This String of Wampum serves to forbid You, Your Children and Grand Children, to the latest Posterity, for ever, medling in Land Affairs...Depart the Council and consider what has been said to you." The Lenape did eventually migrate to Shamokin and the Wyoming Valley, and despite Sassoonan's efforts, many moved further westward into the Ohio River Valley.

== Peace negotiations, 1743 ==
After a series of violent conflicts between Indians and white settlers, Meshemethequater, Sassoonan and other chiefs from the Six Nations (including Shikellamy), the Tuscaroras, and the Lenape met with Conrad Weiser and Andrew Montour at Shamokin on 4 February, 1743, and received wampum from Weiser, who was trying to persuade the Shawnees not to attack English traders living on the Allegheny, to prevent war from erupting. Ultimately, the negotiations were successful.

== Murder of Jack Armstrong, 1744 ==
In April, 1744 Sassoonan was involved in the investigation of the murder of Jack Armstrong, a trader, and two of his servants, after a dispute over a horse. Sassoonan and Shikellamy wanted to identify the murderers and bring them to justice, as the murder of a trader would keep other traders from visiting Shamokin, thus cutting off the supply of valuable trade goods that the Indians were now dependent on. Sassoonan decided to hire a "conjuror," a Lenape medicine man who could discover the identities of the murderers by magic.

The next day, the conjuror identified two men in Shamokin that he claimed had been involved in the murder, and these men were brought to Sassoonan for questioning. One of them was a Lenape Indian named Mussemeelin, who confessed that he had owed Armstrong a debt, and in late 1743 Armstrong had taken Mussemeelin's horse as payment. Mussemeelin later paid Armstrong 20 shillings to settle the debt, but Armstrong refused to return the horse. Mussemeelin and two of his friends later found Armstrong and his servants clearing a road on the Juniata River and killed them.

Conrad Weiser arrived on 2 May, 1744 and heard the confession. Goods that were taken from Armstrong were returned to his brother Alexander, and Mussemeelin and one of the two accomplices were handed over to Weiser, to stand trial in Lancaster, Pennsylvania. The second accomplice was arrested, but the Indians allowed him to escape.

== Later life and death ==
In June, 1745, Bishop August Gottlieb Spangenberg, Conrad Weiser and David Zeisberger visited Sassoonan at Shamokin. The bishop wrote: "[Myself] and Conrad crossed the river to visit the Indian King [Sassoonan] who lives there, and had the honor to smoke a pipe with him." The bishop described "Allummapees" as "very old, almost blind, and very poor; but withal has still power over, and is beloved by his people and is a friend of the English."

Conrad Weiser wrote from Tulpehocken, July 20, 1747: "Olumapies would have resigned his crown before now, but as he had the keeping of the public treasure (that is to say, the Council Bag), consisting of belts of wampum, for which he buys liquor, and has been drunk for these two or three years, almost constantly, and it is thought he won't die as long as there is one single wampum left in the bag."

In another letter Weiser writes: "The Delaware Indians last year [1746] intended to visit Philadelphia, but were prevented by Allumapees' sickness, who is still alive, but not able to stir. Allumapees has no successor of his relations, and he will not hear of none as long as he is alive, and none of the Indians care to meddle in the affair. Shikellamy advises that the government should name Allumapees' successor and set him up by their authority, that at this critical time there might be a man to apply to, since Allumapees has lost his senses and is incapable of doing anything." In September Weiser wrote: "I understand Olumapies is dead, but I cannot say I am sure of it," and on 15 October: "Olumapies is dead." On his death, many Lenape moved to communities on the Allegheny and the Ohio, such as Kittanning, Logstown, and Kuskusky.

== Succession ==
After Sassoonan's death, three of his nephews, Shingas, Tamaqua (King Beaver), and Pisquetomen, succeeded him as sachems. Pisquetomen was initially designated by Sassoonan himself as his successor, however he was intelligent, strong-willed, spoke English, and was not easily manipulated, and so Pennsylvania officials refused to recognize him as "king." James Logan also wanted a leader with the determination to bring those Lenape who had migrated to Ohio back to the Susquehanna region, and felt that Pisquetomen would be unable and unwilling to attempt this. Logan and Conrad Weiser actively tried to promote Lappapitton (also spelled Lappachpitton) as successor, describing him as "an Honest, true-hearted man" with "very good Natural Sence," but Lappapitton declined, saying (according to Weiser) that "he is afraid he will be Envy'd and consequently bewitched by some of the Indians."

For several years after Sassoonan's death there was no recognized Lenape leader, until the Logstown Treaty of 1752, at which the Iroquois insisted that Tanacharison, the Seneca leader in charge of supervising the Lenape, select a leader. Arguing "that is our right to give you a King" to represent the Lenape in "all publick Business," Tanacharison chose Shingas, who was relatively obscure and seemed acceptable to the Pennsylvania government, although they later came to regret the choice when Shingas began a series of bloody raids against English settlements at the start of the French and Indian War.

== Family ==
Some sources list Quenameckquid (known as Charles) and Yaqueekhon (known as Nicholas) as Sassoonan's brothers. One of Sassoonan's daughters (sometimes referred to as Polly) married Opessa Straight Tail in 1711 after Opessa resigned his chieftainship and took refuge in Shamokin. Sassoonan's granddaughter, who is sometimes referred to as Madelina, married Andrew Montour.

== See also ==
- Shamokin
- Shingas
- Pisquetomen
- Opessa Straight Tail
- Meshemethequater
- Walking Purchase
- Tamaqua (Lenape chief)
