= Indian old field =

Indian Old Field, or simply Old Field, was a common term used in Colonial American times and up until the early nineteenth century United States, by American explorers, surveyors, cartographers and settlers, in reference to land formerly cleared and utilized by indigenous or previous occupants for farming (corn fields or vegetable patches) or occupation. The term appears in many old maps and land documents, often persisting for many decades. It also remains in a number of present-day place names of the Eastern US.

== History ==
Pioneer settlers, in applying for their land grants, exhibited a strong preference for sites located along major trails and particularly those coinciding with these Old Fields, as the Native Americans had often prepared land for settlement. Thus, early land survey plats emphasized these features and many place names from New England south to Florida represent vestiges of these places.

The earliest white settlers of Virginia's Shenandoah Valley, which had been vacated by the Indians, noted "Indian old fields". On the earliest Virginia map to show the upper Chesapeake watershed and Allegheny Mountains in any detail (the Jefferson-Fry map of 1751) an extensive area of "old fields" known as "Shawno Fields" was designated at the mouth of the South Branch of the Upper Potomac River. (About nine miles upstream further extensive clearings were noted by the first settlers. A post office and community, "Old Fields", exists at this site to the present day.)

In the 1750s, the explorer and surveyor Christopher Gist, traveling near the Ohio River in what later became western West Virginia, wrote in his journal of "Indian old fields." He described "large meadows, fine clover Bottoms & spacious Plains covered with wild Rye".

A 1761 visitor to the colony of South Carolina noted:

There are dispersed up and down the country several large Indian old fields, which are lands that have been cleared by the Indians, and now remain just as they left them. There arise in many places fine savannahs, or wide extended plains, which do not produce any trees; these are a kind of natural lawns, and some of them as beautiful as those made by art.

As recently as 1912, a genealogist in northern West Virginia published the following definition:

"Old Fields" is a common expression for land that has been cultivated by the Indians and left fallow, which is generally overrun with what they call "broom grass".

== "Old Field" place names ==
Alabama

- Chickasaw Old Fields, downstream from Hobbs Island, Madison County

Florida

- Indian Old Field, earlier name for the Indian Field site, in Lee County, Florida

Tennessee

- Euchee Old Fields (underwater from TVA dam), Rhea County
- Watauga Old Fields, Elizabethton, Carter County

Georgia

- Ocmulgee Old Fields, Macon

North Carolina

- Old Fields, Wilson County

Kentucky

- Indian Old Fields, originally Eskippathiki, last Indian town in Kentucky

Maryland

- Shawnee Old Fields Village Site

New York

- Old Field, Suffolk County

West Virginia:

- Old Field Branch, Greenbrier County
- Old Field Mountain, Greenbrier County
- Old Fields, Hardy County
- Old Field Fork, Lewis County
- Oldfield Branch, Mingo County
- Old Field Fork, Pocahontas County
- Old Field Ridge, Pocohontas County

Pennsylvania

- Clearfield County's name is also thought to be related to Indian old fields.

== See also ==
- Old field (ecology)
