= Straight Tail Meaurroway Opessa =

Straight Tail Meaurroway Opessa (c. 1630–1709), often referred to as Meaurroway, was Chief of the Pekowi, a subdivision of the Shawnee Native American tribe. He was also the Chief of the Turtle Clan, one of the most religious orders of the tribe.

== Biography ==
Straight Tail was born in 1630 in present-day Ohio, to the Chief of the Pekowi and an unnamed Pekowi Woman (possibly Nimeeth Pekowi). Nothing is yet known of his childhood or teenage years, but he succeeded his father at the age of 40 in 1670, as both Pekowi Chief and Chief of the Turtle Clan. Each division of the Shawnee had control over different aspects of the whole tribe's lifestyle, and the Pekowi managed the Shawnee's state of order, duty and celebration of religion. As chief, Straight Tail was in charge of these important aspects of tribal life.

=== Encounter with Martin Chartier ===
In 1674 Straight Tail's band was living in a village on the Wabash River in what is now southern Illinois, where they were visited by French explorer Louis Jolliet and Jacques Marquette and five other men, on their way down the Mississippi. One of Jolliet's men was Martin Chartier (1655–1718) who returned to the Illinois Territory after Jolliet's expedition ended. In 1675 Martin Chartier married Straight Tail's daughter, Sewatha Straight Tail. Their first child, a daughter, was born in 1676, according to a statement Chartier made during a courtroom deposition in 1692. Sewatha Straight Tail later gave birth to Mary Seaworth Chartier (b. 1687) and Peter Chartier (b. 1690). Chartier then returned to Quebec and joined René-Robert Cavelier, Sieur de La Salle on his 1679–1680 journey to the Great Lakes region. In January 1680, he was with La Salle's men building Fort Crèvecoeur when they decided to mutiny. Chartier and his comrades fled, and Chartier took refuge among Straight Tail's band at Starved Rock, for one or two years. He later returned to Montreal as an outlaw, living there in secret for several years.

=== Migrations, 1677–1694 ===
The Shawnee were a migratory people and traveled extensively across eastern North America during the seventeenth and eighteenth centuries. In 1677 Straight Tail led his people to present-day Illinois and Ohio to join up with other bands of Shawnee and with other tribes. Between 1680 and 1685 Straight Tail led his band into Tennessee, where Martin Chartier rejoined them on the Cumberland River, near the present-day site of Nashville, Tennessee.

During the next seven years Straight Tail led his people through present-day Tennessee, Kentucky, Virginia and North Carolina. They migrated north to Cecil County, Maryland in 1692, and in 1694 settled finally in Lancaster County, Pennsylvania.

=== Later life and death ===
Straight Tail eventually gave up his rank of Chief of the Pekowi and the Turtle Clan to his son, Opessa, in 1697. He continued to represent the Shawnees for several years afterwards, however. When in 1698 tensions arose over land rights in Lancaster, Meaurroway attended a conference at the home of John Hansson Steelman on 26 May, with his son-in-law Chartier and three commissioners sent by Nathaniel Blakiston, the Governor of Maryland, and the chiefs of the Susquehannocks and the Delawares. One eyewitness wrote, "In the evening came Meaurroway, king of the Shawaneles, brought on horseback, by reason of his great age, together with one of his great men, and one Martin Shartee [Chartier], a Frenchman, resident and married among them."

Straight Tail Meaurroway Opessa died in Pennsylvania in 1709.

== Children ==
Straight Tail married a Pekowi woman in 1650, having the following children:

- Sewatha Straight Tail: born about 1660 in what is now Ohio, USA. Married to Martin Chartier about 1675. Mother of Mary Seaworth Chartier and Peter Chartier. Died in 1759 in Illinois with her son, during a smallpox epidemic.
- Opessa Straight Tail: born about 1664. Great-grandfather of Tecumseh, famed Shawnee leader during the War of 1812.

== Legacy and intermarriages ==
Unlike other Native American Chiefs before him, Straight Tail did not discourage interracial marriage. He encouraged a good relationship with the Europeans. His daughter, Sewatha, married French-Canadian trader and explorer, Martin Chartier. Other children and their descendants also married whites. One grandson was Peter Chartier, who was active in opposition to the British in the French and Indian War.

Straight Tail's son, Opessa Straight Tail (1664-1750) became chief of his Pekowi band in 1697 and signed several peace treaties with William Penn before deciding to lead his people to the Ohio River Valley in about 1727.

Two of Straight Tail's grandchildren, Loyparcowah and Meshemethequater, were also Shawnee leaders at Lower Shawneetown. One of his great granddaughters, Margaret Tecumsapah Opessa, was stepmother to Colonel Alexander McKee (1735-1799).

== See also ==
- Shawnee Old Fields Village Site
- Martin Chartier
