= Meshemethequater =

18th century Pekowi Shawnee chief

Big Hominy
- Born: Meshemethequater; 1690 or 1691; Pennsylvania
- Died: 1758 (aged 67 or 68); Lower Shawneetown
- Years active: 1738–1758
- Known for: Promoting peaceful coexistence with English colonists
- Parent: Tamenebuck Cornstalk (father)

Meshemethequater (1690 or 1691–1758) also known as Big Hominy, Great Huminy, Misemeathaquatha, Missemediqueety, or Big Hannoana was a Pekowi Shawnee chief from western Pennsylvania. Although he was a respected warrior, he is best known for participating in peace conferences that prevented war between English settlers and the Shawnees. In 1745 he joined Peter Chartier and other Shawnees who chose loyalty to New France, but after three years he returned to Pennsylvania and apologized. His date and place of death are unknown.

== Early life and family ==
He was the son of Tamenebuck Cornstalk and a grandson of Straight Tail Meaurroway Opessa (1630–1709). He was a cousin of Peter Chartier (1690–1759), another grandson of Straight Tail Meaurroway Opessa. At the time of his birth, Opessa's band of Pekowi Shawnee had just arrived in what is now western Pennsylvania and were camped where the Monongahela River and the Allegheny River join to form the Ohio River, the present-day site of Pittsburgh. One source states that in 1711 Meshemethequater married an older sister of Nonhelema (1718–1786), but nothing is known of his children.

== Career ==
=== 1739 peace conference ===
He was a chief by 1738 and came with his father (Tamenebuck), Cacowatchike, Neucheconeh, and other Shawnee chiefs to a peace treaty conference in Philadelphia with Thomas Penn, from 27 July to 1 August 1739. Colonial authorities were concerned about the migration of Shawnee and Lenape communities from Pennsylvania to the Ohio River valley, where it was feared that they would become allies of New France. Population pressure from increasing numbers of European colonists had reduced the availability of game for hunting, creating problems for the Indian populations which subsisted largely on game during the winter months. This westward shift of Shawnee communities led to the migration of many to the Ohio River Valley. Secretary James Logan told the Shawnee,

Since your nation first left their settlement near Paxtang, on the west side of the Susquehanna, and retired to so great a distance as the River Ohio, or Allegheny, this Government has ever been desirous of a conference with some of your chiefs. Some of your older men may undoubtedly remember that about forty years ago a considerable number of families of your nation thought it fit to remove from the great river that bears your name, where your principal correspondence was with those of the French nation.

A new treaty was concluded at this council, in which it was declared that the Shawnees had moved from their former home on the Susquehanna to the Allegheny. Although Meshemethequater voiced approval for the treaty, his signature does not appear on the printed page.

=== 1743 peace conference ===
After a series of violent conflicts between Native Americans and Euro-American settlers, including the Battle of Galudoghson, Meshemethequater, Sassoonan and other chiefs from the Six Nations (including Shikellamy), the Tuscaroras, and the Lenape met with Conrad Weiser and Andrew Montour at the village of Shamokin on 4 February 1743, and received wampum from Weiser, who was trying to persuade the Shawnees not to attack English traders living on the Allegheny, to prevent war from erupting. Weiser described Meshemethequater as "A captain of war, and a very noted man among the Shawonese; the English call him the Great Huminy." Ultimately, the negotiations were successful.

=== Travels with Chartier, 1745-1748 ===
He was with his cousin Peter Chartier, Neucheconeh, and about 400 Shawnees on 18 April 1745, when they robbed eight English traders of their goods on the Allegheny River. He then went with Chartier to the Ohio River Valley and stayed in Lower Shawneetown until 24 June 1745, when he went with Chartier to Kentucky, where they established the community of Eskippakithiki. In 1747 he accompanied Chartier's band of Shawnees to areas now in Tennessee, Alabama and South Carolina. In mid-1748, Meshemethequater and other Shawnee leaders apparently had misgivings about leaving Pennsylvania and returned to Lancaster with part of Chartier's band. In council with Scarouady on 20 July they submitted an apology for having joined with Chartier. In a letter to Conrad Weiser dated 23 June 1748 Anthony Palmer, President of the Pennsylvania Provincial Council, says of the repentant Shawnees:

...they relented, made acknowledgment to the Government of their error in being seduced by Peter Chartier, and prayed they might be permitted to return to their old Town, and be taken again as sincere penitents into the favor of the Government.

=== Return to Lower Shawneetown ===
Meshemethequater returned to Lower Shawneetown in 1750, and met George Croghan, Andrew Montour, Robert Callander and Christopher Gist there on 30 January 1751, during which he was the chief speaker for the Shawnees and made a warm speech which concluded: "We hope that the Friendship now subsisting between us & our Brothers will last as long as the Sun Shines or the Moon gives light." On 8 February 1752 he signed a letter to Governor James Hamilton, pledging to support the English against the French after the French reportedly killed some Twightwee warriors. Big Hominy, Loapeckaway (Loyparcowah, Opessa's son), Nickiphock, and Lawackamicky were named as among the chiefs at the Lower Shawneetown in 1752.

Meshemethequater and his wife are believed to have died in 1758 during an epidemic.

== See also ==
- Peter Chartier
- Opessa Straight Tail
- Logstown
- Kakowatcheky
- Neucheconeh
