= Kakowatcheky =

Pekowi Shawnee chief

- Born: c. 1670 possibly Ohio
- Died: 1755 or 1758 (aged 85 or 88); Logstown
- Years active: 1694-1752
- Known for: Leading the first Shawnees into Pennsylvania, 1694
- Successor: Poxinosa

Kakowatcheky (c. 1670 - c. 1755 or 1758), also known as Kakowatchiky, Cachawatsiky, Kakowatchy, or Kakowatchey, was a Pekowi Shawnee chief believed to be among the first to bring Shawnee people into Pennsylvania. For about fifty years he and the Shawnees lived together with European colonists in Pennsylvania until the mid-1740s when many Shawnees and other Native Americans migrated to the Ohio River Valley.

In 1743, Kakowatcheky moved to Logstown, on the Ohio River, where he may have continued to live until 1755 or later, that being the last year in which his name appears in the Pennsylvania records. Colonel James Patton of Virginia visited Logstown in June 1752 and refers to him in his journal as being then bedridden. His chieftainship extended for more than sixty years.

== Arrival in Pennsylvania ==
Nothing is known of his early life, including his exact date of birth. He may have been born in Ohio. John Heckewelder in his brief history of the "Shawanos" refers to "Chief Gachgawatschiqua," who he says led his people from Ohio and settled at the forks of the Delaware River. He does not provide a date, but Charles Augustus Hanna estimated that this occurred around 1694.

Kakowatcheky led an unknown number Shawnees from the Ohio River Valley to eastern Pennsylvania, together with the Dutch trader and explorer Arnaut Viele. The migration occurred after Viele had traveled from Albany, New York to the Susquehanna River, then to the Allegheny River which he navigated to the Ohio River, which he followed west until he reached the Wabash River. After more than a year living with the Shawnee and other tribes in Ohio, Viele returned to Albany in September, 1694, accompanied by Kakowatcheky and his Shawnees, who then settled in Pennsylvania.

New York's governor, Thomas Dongan was anxious to acquire new Native American allies to support the English colonists against the expansion of New France. The trade in animal skins and furs was a major part of the colonial economy and the Shawnees' skill as hunters was highly prized. Kakowatcheky recognized that by moving east, he was bringing the Shawnees into Haudenosaunee territory, but within a few years he and Opessa Straight Tail had persuaded the English that the Shawnee presence was of economic as well as military value, influencing the Pennsylvania Provincial Government to grant the Shawnee and a few other tribes favored status through a multilateral treaty in 1701.

=== 1701 treaty ===
On 23 April, 1701, Opessa and chiefs of the Susquehannock), Piscataway and Onondaga tribes signed a treaty with William Penn ceding lands along the Potomac River to the English in return for protection and trade privileges. By this treaty "it was settled that no Indians be suffered to settle on the Susquehanna or Patomack save those already noted [Shawnee, Mingoes and Gawanese]." Opessa and the other chiefs agreed by their "hands and seals," with each other, with William Penn and his successors, and with other inhabitants of the province, "to be as one head and one heart, and to live in true friendship and amity, as one people." Soon after the Treaty of 1701 many Shawnee migrated from South Carolina to the lower Susquehanna and the upper Delaware, where they settled near the Forks, at a village called Pechoquealin (now Smithfield Township, Monroe County, Pennsylvania).

=== Conflicts with colonial settlers ===
Under the name "Cohevwickick" Kakowatcheky is referred to in the New Jersey Colonial Records, 30 May, 1709, as one of the sachems of the Shawhena Indians.

In 1727, because of various conflicts with the traders in the Province, and because of the unrestricted sale of rum, the Shawnee began migrating west towards Ohio, to escape from the oppressive control of the Haudenosaunee as well as from problems with the Pennsylvania Provincial authorities.

In early May 1728, Kakowatcheky, who was the head of the Shawnees living at Pechoquealin, heard a rumor that the Catawbas from North Carolina had entered Pennsylvania with the intention of attacking the Indians along the Susquehanna. Kakowatcheky then led eleven warriors to discover if there was any truth to this rumor. When they came into the neighborhood of Manatawny in the northern part of Berks County, Pennsylvania, they had run out of provisions and tried to force the settlers to give them food and drink. The settlers did not know these Indians (and were unaware of the rule of Indian etiquette requiring neutrals to provide passing warriors with food on request), and believing the chief of the band to be dangerous, the women and children fled in terror.

A group of about twenty settlers took up arms and approached the Indians, sending two men to speak with Kakowatcheky, who, instead of receiving them civilly, drew his sword and commanded his men to fire, which they did, wounding five of the settlers. The other settlers returned fire, wounding Kakowatcheky, who fell, but then got up and ran into the woods, leaving his rifle behind. The identity of these Indians was not known to the settlers until May 20th, when two traders from Pechoquealin came to Governor Gordon and delivered a message from Kakowatcheky, explaining the unfortunate affair, sending his regrets, and asking the Governor for the return of the gun which he had dropped when wounded. The Governor replied with a reprimand for Kakowatcheky's aggressive behavior:

It was not becoming [for] any of our friends to come into the Christians' Houses with Guns, pistoles and Swords, painted for War, and to take away the poor People's Provisions by force with great threatnings to those that opposed them. This is not a behaviour becoming [of] friends, nor what we expected of the Shawanese. The English thought these men were foreign Indians come from the French or Spaniards. They went out with some few Arms to defend themselves, but spoke civilly to them and inquired who they were...All the English that went out affirm the Indians fired five Shott before they fired one. And there are Five of our People Sorely wounded...It is well that no lives were lost on either side. These eleven Indians through their foolish behaviour have caused great Confusion...The Governor will take care to inquire for the Gun & other things the Indians have lost, and they may have them again if they are found...The Governor will be glad to see Kakowatchy at Durham some time this year...He will then treat him as his Friend & Brother.

Governor Gordon then went to Manatawny and personally pleaded with those settlers who had left their plantations to return. Having sent Kakowatcheky the gun he had dropped, as well as the tomahawks dropped by his eleven warriors when they fled from the band of twenty settlers, the governor requested that the Indians under his authority be more careful in the future. On 26 May, the Governor, accompanied by thirty residents of Philadelphia, met the Indians at a council at Conestoga where he conferred with Conestoga (Susquehannock), Shawnee, Conoy (Piscataway), and Delaware chiefs, and gave them presents. As it turned out, the invasion by Catawba warriors had been a false alarm.

Towards the end of that same year, Kakowatcheky and the Shawnees under him left the upper Delaware for Wyomink and the Shawnee Flats on the north branch of the Susquehanna (just below the present town of Plymouth, Pennsylvania) in Luzerne County at Skehandowana (Iroquoian for "Great Flats").

As early as 1732, Kakowatcheky was thinking about moving to the Ohio River Valley, as many Shawnees had already started migrating westward. One reason for this was dissatisfaction with the Haudenosaunee, whose control over the Shawnee had been rigid. Tyoninhogarao, a Seneca chief, visited Kakowatcheky in Wyomink in August, 1732 and told him that "the Iroquois never intended to hurt the Shawanese; that he should not look to Ohio, but turn his face to them."

Kakowatcheky's son Quassenung was attending a conference in Philadelphia when he contracted smallpox and died on 26 January, 1733.

=== 1739 treaty ===
On 27 July 1739, Cacowatchike (Kakowatcheky), Newcheconneh, Tamenebuck, and Meshemethequater, chiefs of the Shawnees, with 25 other Shawnees, came to Philadelphia from Wyomink and Allegheny, and held a council with Governor Thomas Penn. Colonial authorities were concerned at the migration of Shawnee and Lenape communities from Pennsylvania to the Ohio River valley, where it was feared that they would become allies of New France. Secretary James Logan told them,

since your nation first left their settlement near Pextang, on the west side of the Susquehanna, and retired to so great a distance as the River Ohio, or Allegheny, this Government has ever been desirous of a conference with some of your chiefs. Some of your older men may undoubtedly remember that about forty years ago a considerable number of families of your nation thought it fit to remove from the great river that bears your name, where your principal correspondence was with those of the French nation.

The Indians were then reminded of the obligations entered into between their chief, Opessa, and William Penn, in 1701. A new treaty was concluded at this council, in which it was declared that the Shawnees had moved to the Allegheny from their former home on the Susquehanna. This treaty was signed on behalf of the Shawnees on the Juniata River and Susquehanna River by Kaycowockewr (Kakowatcheky), chief of those at Wyomink, and by Newcheconner and Tomenebuck, for the Shawnees of Allegheny. Population pressure from increasing numbers of European colonists had reduced the availability of game for hunting, creating problems for the Indian populations which subsisted largely on game during the winter months. This westward shift of Shawnee communities led to the migration of many to the Ohio River Valley.

=== Encounter with Count Zinzendorf ===
In October 1742 the missionary Count Zinzendorf, founder of the renewed Moravian Church, together with Andrew Montour and Conrad Weiser, visited Kakowatcheky at his community of Wyomink with the intention of converting them to Christianity. Zinzendorf, unable to get the Indians to even listen to him, gave them all of his buttons and shoe buckles in an effort to please them. Kakowatcheky was patient and considerate to Zinzendorf during the missionary's stay at Wyomink. The count had angered some of Kakowatcheky's band when he pitched his tent about a mile away from the village near an old silver mine and on top of the village burial ground. The Shawnees suspected that Zinzendorf was conjuring spirits in his tent to show him the location of the silver mine, and wanted to kill this "sorcerer," but Kakowatcheky was able to use his diplomatic skill and authority to keep the count and his party safe.

Kakowatchiky made the following comment in a conversation with Zinzendorf, as recorded by Conrad Weiser who was present:

The old chief thanked the Count "in the most courteous manner" for proposing his conversion to the Christian faith. He said that he, too, believed in God, who had created both the Indian and the white man. But he went on to explain why, after what he had seen of white men on the frontier, he preferred Indian ways and beliefs; for, he said, the white man prayed with words while the Indian prayed with his heart. He himself was an Indian of God’s creation and he was satisfied with his condition and had no wish to be a European; above all he was a subject of the Iroquois, it did not behoove him to take up new Things without their Advice or Example. If the Iroquois chose to become Europeans, and learned to pray like them: he would have nothing to say against it, but he liked the Indian Way of Life. God had been very kind to him even in his old Age and would continue to look well after him. God was better pleased with the Indians than with the Europeans. It was wonderful how much he helped them.

=== 1743 peace negotiations ===
After a series of violent conflicts between Indians and white settlers, Meshemethequater and other chiefs from the Six Nations (including Shikellamy), the Tuscaroras, and the Lenape met with Conrad Weiser and Andrew Montour at Shamokin, Pennsylvania in April 1743, and received wampum from Weiser, who was trying to persuade the Shawnees not to attack English traders living on the Allegheny, to prevent war from erupting. When the Council at Shamokin came to consider the messages sent by Weiser to the Shawnees, "then the speaker, in behalf of Cachawatsiky [Kakowatcheky] the Shawonese chief at Wyomink, and of Nochecouna, the Shawonese chief at Ohio, related their answers to two messages that were sent with some strings of wampum by the Council held at Shamokin [in February 1743]. He began with Nochecouna's answer, directed to the Governor of Pennsylvania:

Brother, the Governor of Pennsylvania: I live upon this River of Ohio, harmless, like a little child. I can do nothing; I am but weak; and I don't so much as intend mischief. I have nothing to say and do; therefore, send these strings of wampum to [Kakowatcheky], the chief man, again. He will answer your message, as he is the older and greater man.

Ultimately, the negotiations were successful.

== Move to Logstown ==
Between April 1743 and August 1744, Kakowatcheky himself, with some of his followers, moved to the Ohio River Valley and settled at Logstown. He is sometimes credited with having founded Logstown, but there is evidence that a community existed there before his arrival.

=== Encounter with Peter Chartier ===
In late April 1745, Peter Chartier and about 400 Pekowi Shawnees, including Meshemethequater and Neucheconeh, stopped at Logstown to visit Kakowatcheky and to try to persuade him to join them. Chartier's plan at that time was to bring as many Shawnees as he could over to French protection, and he was on his way to Lower Shawneetown to address the Shawnees living there. Kakowatcheky, however, refused to join him, and Chartier and his people left Logstown after a brief stay.

On 21 July 1748, at the Council at Lancaster, Pennsylvania, Kakowatcheky and several other Shawnee leaders came before the Commissioners, apologized for having been misled by Chartier, and asked to be forgiven. Although Kakowatcheky had not followed Chartier to Ohio, as had Neucheconeh and Meshemethequater, he participated in the apology and was commended by the Provincial authorities for maintaining his loyalty to the British:

Kakowatcheky and his friends, who had virtue enough to resist the many fine promises made by the emissaries of the French, will ever be remembered with gratitude, and challenge our best services.

On 28 April, 1748 Kakowatcheky was met by George Croghan during a council at Logstown. Croghan had been sent by the Colony of Pennsylvania to advise the Ohio and Allegheny Indians that Conrad Weiser would come later that year to make a treaty with them in behalf of the Colony, and to distribute gifts. Weiser arrived at Logstown in September 1748 as the head of what is generally considered the first embassy by the Colony of Pennsylvania to the Indians of the Ohio and Allegheny. Weiser's journal, under the date of 10 September, contains the following entry:

This day I made a present to the old Shawnee chief, Kakowatcheky, of a strand, a blanket, a matchcoat, a shirt, a pair of stockings, and a large twist of tobacco, and told him that the President and Council of Philadelphia remembered their love to him as to their old and true friend, and would clothe his body once more, and wished he might wear them out, so as to give them an opportunity to clothe him again. There was a great many Indians present, two of which were the Big Hominy and the Pride, those that went off with Chartier, but protested his proceedings against our traders. Kakowatcheky returned thanks, and some of the Six Nations did the same, and expressed their satisfaction to see a true man taken notice of.

=== Encounter with Céloron de Blainville ===
In early August 1749 Pierre Joseph Céloron de Blainville's expedition down the Ohio river arrived in Logstown, and Kakowatcheky, fearing an assault, rallied the town's population in its defense. According to William Trent, "the Indians ran to their arms and hoisted the English Colors. Cawcaw-wi-cha-ke, the Shawnese King about 114 years of age, set his back against the flag staff with his gun in his hand and desired the young men to kill them all." Céloron then made a speech warning the inhabitants of the town to stop trading with the English, implying that the French would punish any disobedience. On 10 August, Céloron read a message from the Marquis de La Galissonière, the Governor of New France, which described how the English were deceiving the Ohio tribes and planning their "total ruin," adding: "I know the English only inspire you with evil sentiments, and, besides, intend, through their establishments on the Beautiful River, which belongs to me, to take it from me." Kakowatcheky was apparently outraged. George Croghan, who arrived in Logstown a few days after Céloron had left, told Richard Peters that

Old Cackewatcheka was so exasperated at the Pride & Insolence of the French pretending to say that the Indian's land belonged to them that while he [Céloron] was in the midst of his Speech, the old King being blind and unable to stand without somebody to support him said in a low voice to those next to him, Why don't you shoot this French Fellow - Shoot him - shoot him.

== Final years ==
On 21 May, 1751 George Croghan visited Logstown to attend a council there with chiefs of the Six Nations, the Lenape and the Shawnees. In his report to the Pennsylvania Provincial Council he wrote:

I paid Cochawitchake the old Shawonese king a visit, as he was rendered incapable of attending the council by reason of his great age, and let him know that his brother the Governor of Pennsylvania was glad to hear that he was still alive and that he retained his senses, and had ordered me to cloathe him and to acquaint him that he had not forgot his strict Attachment to the English Interest. I gave him a Strowd Shirt, Match Coat, and a pair of Stockings, for which he gave the Governor a great many thanks.

In June, 1752, The Treaty of Logstown was signed by representatives of the Haudenosaunee Confederation, Lenape and Shawnee leaders, and commissioners from Virginia headed by Joshua Fry. Christopher Gist and William Trent represented the Ohio Company. On 11 June the commissioners, addressing themselves to the Shawnees, "acquainted them that they understood that their chief, Cockawichy [Kakowatcheky], who had been a good friend to the English, was lying bed-rid, and that, to show the regard they had for his past services, they took this opportunity to acknowledge it by presenting him with a suit of Indian clothing."

He is called "Cachawatkecha" by Governor Morris, in a letter of 20 August 1755, and referred to as possibly still living at Logstown. His name does not appear in contemporary records after 1755, although some historians give his date of death as 1758. Kakowatcheky was succeeded as chief at Wyomink by Paxinosa.

== Legacy ==
Historian Malcolm B. Brown describes Kakowatcheky as "A perceptive and astute observer of people, he was one of the wisest and most revered of the sachems of the era, and was more aware of the consequences of Euroamerican-Indian contact than almost anyone else at the time."

== See also ==
- Peter Chartier
- Meshemethequater
- Opessa Straight Tail
- Logstown
