= Old field (ecology) =

Land formerly cultivated or grazed but later abandoned

Old field is a term used in ecology to describe lands formerly cultivated or grazed but later abandoned. The dominant flora include perennial grasses, heaths and herbaceous plants. Old fields are canonically defined as an intermediate stage found in ecological succession in an ecosystem advancing towards its climax community, a concept which has been debated by contemporary ecologists for some time.

Old field sites are often marginal lands with soil quality unsuitable for crops or pasture. Examples include abandoned farmlands in central Ontario, along the edge of the Canadian Shield.

Stress tolerant species with wide seed dispersal ranges are able to colonize cultivated fields after their initial abandonment, usually followed by perennial grasses. The succession of old fields culminates in takeover by trees and shrubs, eventually leading to a climax forest stand.

== How old fields form ==
Most old fields form as a result of agricultural land abandonment, the rate of which has been exponentially increasing, at a global scale, since the 1950s.

Agricultural plots may be abandoned due to degraded nutrient levels in the soil following many growing seasons and/or crop rotations. In some cases, however, specifically in Europe during the late 1950s and early 1960's, farm lands were abandoned due to a new agriculture policy. The policy influenced farmers to abandon plots because they believed it made prices too high, was wasteful, and would lead to overproduction. Though the policy has changed over time, researchers believe it is still failing the EU in many ways and ultimately harming the ecology of farm lands.

== Old field succession ==
Once abandoned and left unaltered for a long time, and without crops to deplete the soil of nutrients, old fields can slowly grow back into healthy communities via the process of ecological succession.

Many studies have been conducted on old field succession, the process by which fields slowly grow back into forests over many years. While there are two types of succession, primary and secondary, secondary succession is what we think about when considering old fields. These processes may be cyclic or seral depending on the system dynamics and community structure present. Cyclic succession occurs when species abundance is in a constant state of change, when there are continuous changes in community composition that result in the dominant species changing in a cyclical manner. Seral succession refers to a type of community structure where community succession follows a linear path from barren to a climax community.

With succession, soil nutrient concentrations and community composition can vary greatly. As time passes after abandonment, nitrogen concentration in the soil has been shown to increase, which influences an increase in above ground plant biomass and vegetation cover.

== Ecological significance ==
=== Restoration ===
Because agricultural lands are being abandoned and more old fields are forming each year, studying the composition of organisms and succession dynamics within old fields could provide potentially valuable insights to ecological restoration. Researchers state that studying the mechanisms behind succession of old fields at a local level can provide valuable restoration insights on how plant communities in the same region may respond to other stressors.

== See also ==
- Brownfield land: abandoned or underused industrial and commercial facilities
- Greenfield land: undeveloped land in a city or rural area
- Indian old field: land formerly occupied or used by Native Americans in the United States
- Urban prairie: vacant urban land that has reverted to green space
