= Eskippakithiki =

- Indigenous settlement
- Location within the state of Kentucky Eskippakithiki (the United States)
- Coordinates: 37°56′22.4″N 83°59′51.1″W
- Established: 1718

Eskippakithiki was a Shawnee village and the last known Native American settlement in the state of Kentucky. The name "Eskippakithiki" means "Blue Licks Town" in the Shawnee language. It was located approximately at Indian Old Fields, which was an unincorporated community in Clark County, Kentucky. It was established around 1718 by the Shawnee, which abandoned the settlement at the beginning of the French and Indian War (approximately 1754–55).

== Historical marker ==
A historical marker mentioning Eskippakithiki is located on Kentucky Route 974 at Indian Old Fields (Marker Number 1274). This inscription reads:

Site of Eskippakithiki, sometimes called "Kentake," located on the Warrior's Path. This meeting place for traders and Indian hunters was the last of the Kentucky Indian towns. Occupied by the Shawnees, ca. 1715-1754. John Finley had a store here and traded with the Indians, 1752. Daniel Boone viewed "the beautiful level of Kentucky" from this point on June 7, 1769.

== See also ==
- History of Kentucky
- Paleontology in Kentucky
