= Kittanning (village) =

Kittanning Village Kit-Han-Nee
- Historic Native American village
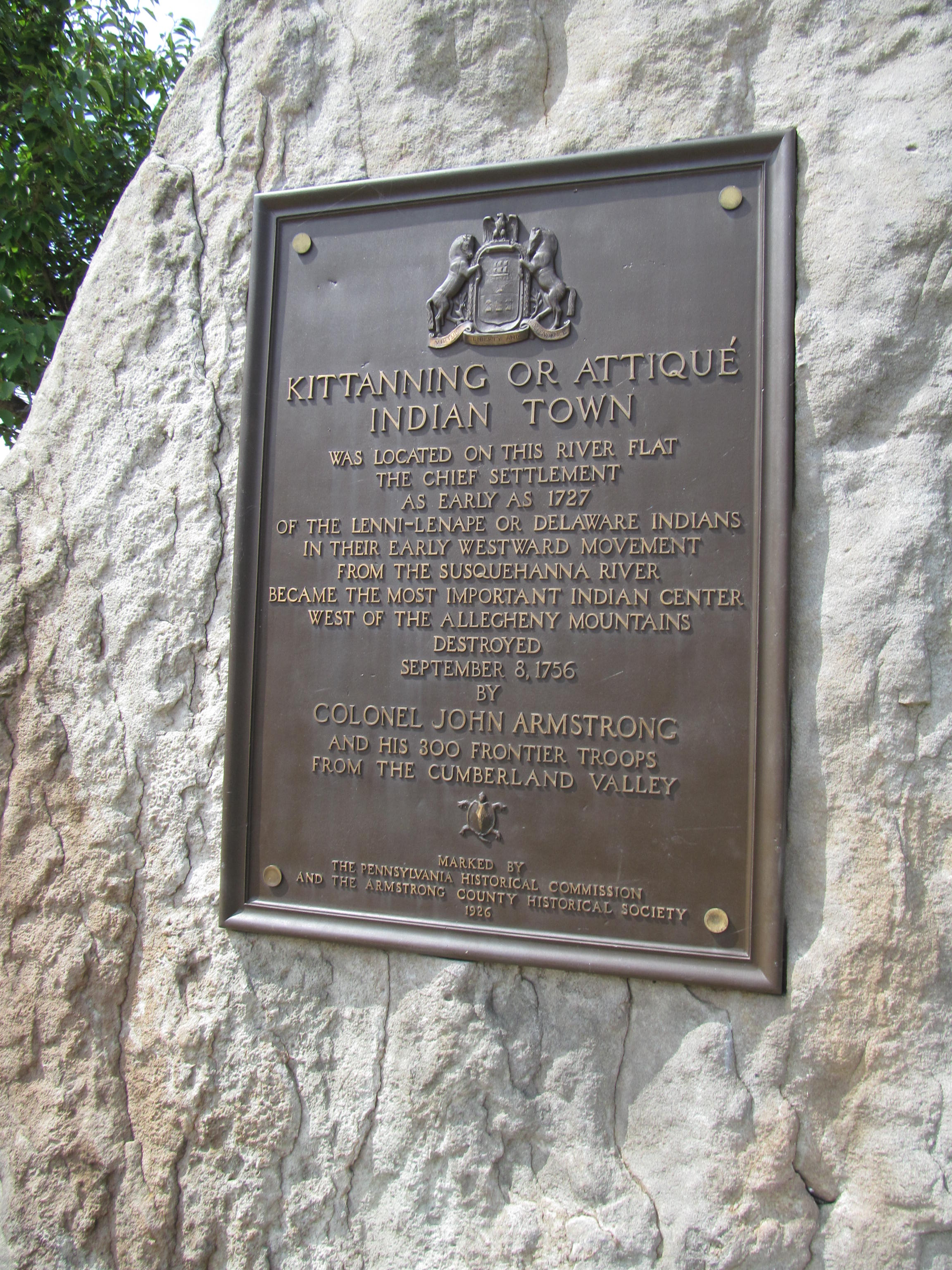
- Plaque at the site of Kittanning Village
- Etymology: Unami: kithanink kit- 'big' + hane 'mountain river' + -ink (suffix used in place names). "The main river"
- Location of Kittanning Village in Armstrong County, Pennsylvania

- Location of Pennsylvania in the United States
- Coordinates: 40.820085°N 79.521398°W
- State: Pennsylvania
- Present-day Community: Kittanning, Pennsylvania
- Founded: 1724-1725
- Demolished: 8 September 1756

Population
  - Estimate (1754): 300−400

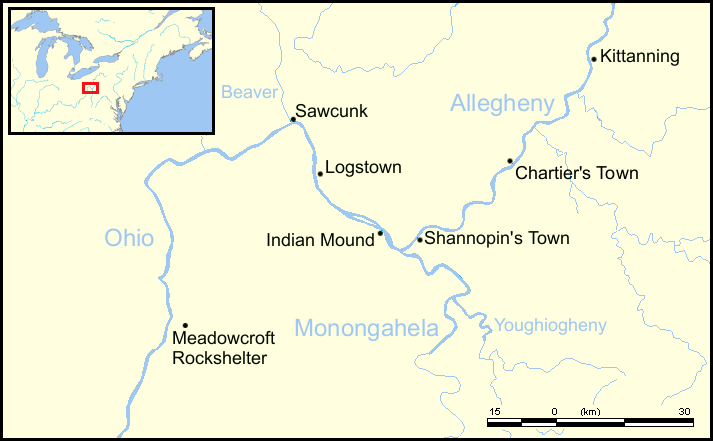
Kittanning (top right) and other Native American villages and points of interest, most circa 1750s

Kittanning (Lenape Kithanink; pronounced [kitˈhaːniŋ]) was an 18th-century Native American village in the Ohio Country, located on the Allegheny River at present-day Kittanning, Pennsylvania. The village was at the western terminus of the Kittanning Path, an Indian trail that provided a route across the Alleghenies between the Ohio and Susquehanna river basins.

Together with Logstown, Pickawillany, Sandusky, and Lower Shawneetown, Kittanning was one of several large multiethnic and autonomous "Indian republics" made up of a variety of smaller disparate social groups: village fragments, extended families, or individuals, often survivors of epidemics and refugees from conflicts with other Native Americans or with Europeans.

Kittanning served as a staging area for Delaware and Shawnee raids on British colonial settlements during the French and Indian War, until Pennsylvania provincial troops under the command of Colonel John Armstrong destroyed the village on 8 September 1756.

== Etymology ==
The name Kithanink means 'on the main river' in the Lenape language, from kit- 'big' + hane 'mountain river' + -ink (suffix used in place names). "The main river" is a Lenape epithet for the Allegheny and Ohio, considered as all one river. The Six Nations tribes referred to the town as Adego, or Atiga, from which the French derived the names they used for the town, "Attigué" or "Attiqué".

== History ==
=== Establishment, 1724 ===
The village was initially settled in 1724 by Delaware (Lenape) of the Turtle (Pùkuwànku) and Turkey (Pële) clans who were relocating westward due to pressure from expanding European settlements near Shamokin. It eventually became one of the largest Native American villages on the western side of the Alleghenies, having an estimated 300–400 residents in 1756. In a conference between Pennsylvania provincial authorities and the chiefs of the Six Nations at Albany on 3 July 1754, Conrad Weiser, an interpreter from Pennsylvania, told the colonials: "The road to Ohio is no new road; it is an old and frequented road; the Shawnese and Delawares removed thither above thirty years ago from Pennsylvania."

By 1727, Pennsylvania traders including Edmund Cartlidge, Jonah Davenport, and James Le Tort, along with others, were trading at the Allegheny, with headquarters on the "Kythenning River". Anthony Sadowski established a trading post at Kittanning in June, 1729. In October 1731, Jonah Davenport and James Le Tort, in separate affidavits made before Lieutenant Governor Patrick Gordon, reported that "last spring there were at Kythenning on the Kythenning River, fifty families and one hundred and fifty men, most Delaware." The population grew as groups of Lenape, Cayugas, Senecas, and Shawnees migrated west into the Ohio River Valley seeking to escape a smallpox epidemic in 1733 and a drought in 1741, creating a multi-ethnic community. The Shawnee established several smaller communities nearby, including Neucheconeh's Town, later known as Chartier's Town after the Shawnee leader Peter Chartier. Kittanning, with two or three smaller villages, and several on the Kiskiminetas River, constituted a center of Lenape and Shawnee population known as "Allegeney" or "Allegania".

=== Trade with New France ===
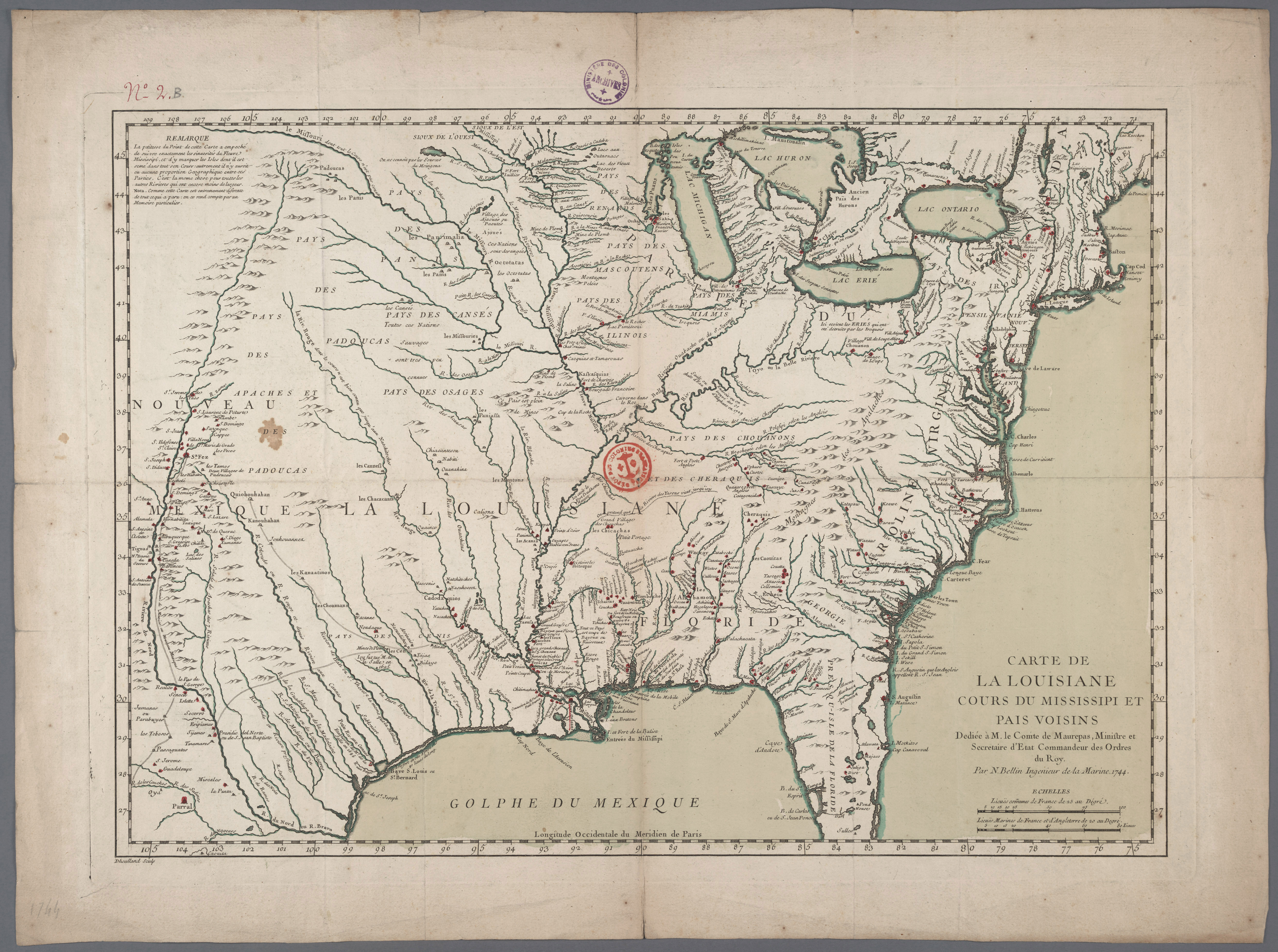
1744 map of eastern North America by Jacques-Nicolas Bellin, showing "Vill. Atiga" on the Ohio ("Oyo") River, probably the first representation of Kittanning on any map.

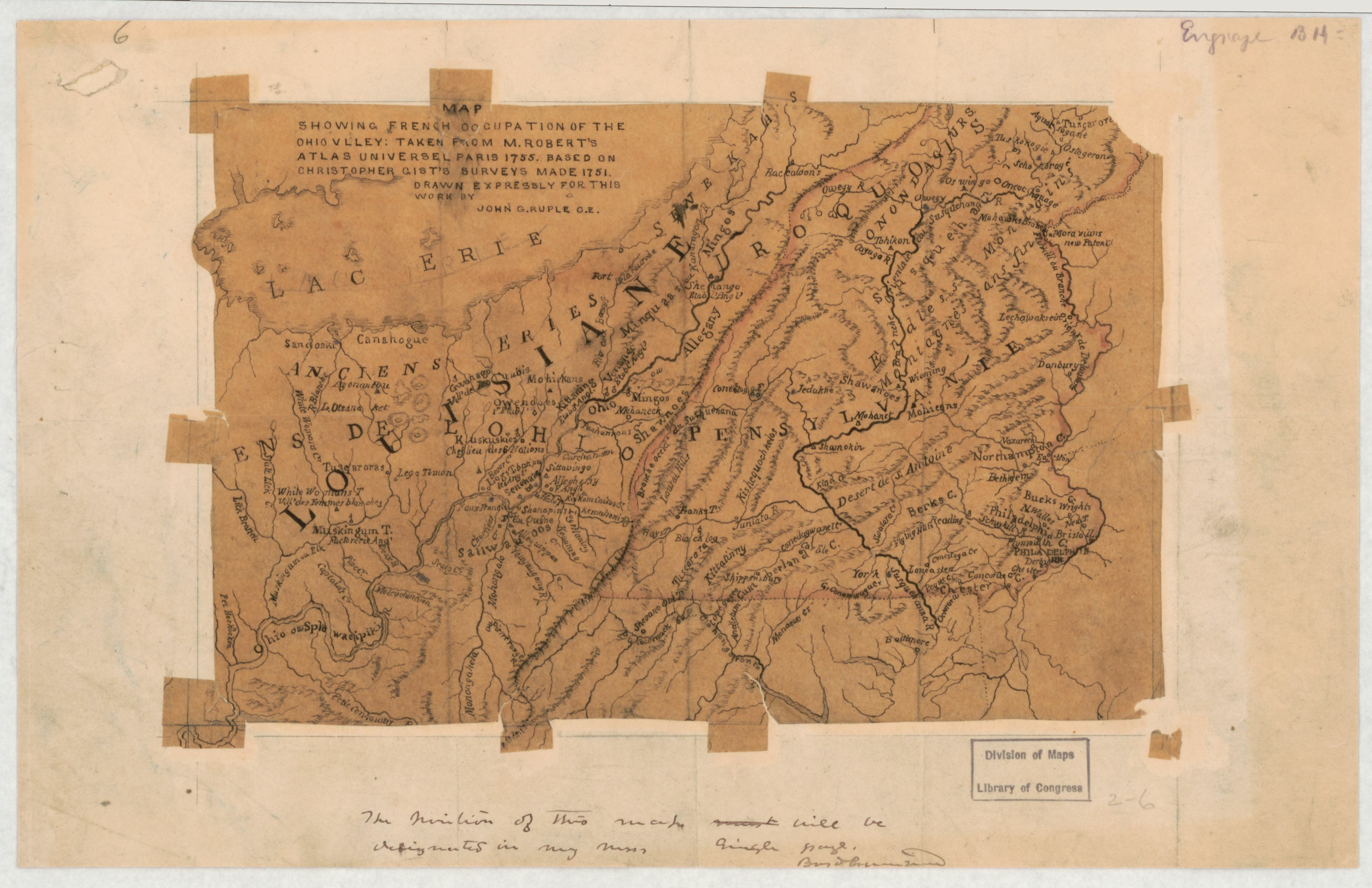
Map showing the French occupation of the Ohio Valley, based on Christopher Gist's surveys of 1751, showing "Kittaning" to the left of the center of the page.

As early as 1726 the French made contact with the inhabitants of Kittanning and other Native American communities on the Allegheny. In a report written 1 October 1728, the Marquis de Beauharnois, Governor of New France, wrote that the Nation of the Chaouanons (Shawnees)

"has been much attached to the French ... These Indians have begun a village on the river Ohio, which already contains more than 150 men and their families. They have traded from all time with the French, and are a very industrious people, cultivating a good deal of land ... Cavillier is the name of the person whom M. de Beauharnois has permitted to return to the Chaouanons. He is understood and known by these Indians, and will probably negotiate this affair with success."

In a deposition made by James Le Tort and Jonas Davenport at Philadelphia on 29 October 1731, they stated that they had

"... lately come from Allegeney, where there are Indian settlements consisting of about three hundred Delawares, two hundred and sixty Shawnees, one hundred Asswekalaes, and some Mingoes ... and that ... a French gentleman, in appearance, came down the river to a settlement of the Delaware Indians on the Ohio River, which the Delawares call Kithanning, with an intention ... to enquire into the numbers of English Traders in those parts, and to sound the minds of the Indians."

On 7 December 1731, the Quaker trader Edmund Cartlidge, in a deposition in Lancaster County, Pennsylvania stated: "For these five years past except that of 1729, a French gentleman who calls himself Cavalier has made it his practice to come every spring among the Indians settled there ... and that it is generally believed by all the Traders at Allegeney ... that this Cavalier is the bearer of the Governor of Montreal's messages to the Indians in these parts."

=== Petitions to the Pennsylvania Provincial Council, 1733-43 ===
On 24 April 1733, the Shawnee chiefs at Kittanning sent a petition to Governor Gordon complaining that "There is yearly and monthly some new upstart of a trader without license, who comes amongst us and brings with him nothing but rum ..." and asking permission to destroy the casks of rum: "We therefore beg thou would take it into consideration, and send us two firm orders, one for Peter Chartier, the other for us, to break in pieces all the [casks] so brought." Chartier was a licensed trader for Shawnee communities who later became a Shawnee leader.

In 1734 the Council received a second letter, dated 1 May, from Neucheconeh and other Shawnee chiefs living in Kittanning and other communities on the Allegheny, responding to Pennsylvania's repeated requests that the Shawnees return to the Susquehanna Valley. The letter complained about certain traders who sold rum to the Shawnees, and they requested that these men be "kept particularly" from trading amongst the Shawnees. They then endorsed several traders whom "we desire may have Licence to come and trade with us, as also Peter Cheartier, who we reckon one of us, and he is welcome to come as long as he pleases." They also petitioned that "no trader above-mentioned may be allowed to bring more than 30 Gallons of Rum, twice in a year and no more", as excessive drinking was starting to have social and economic effects on the Shawnee people.

On 6 June 1743, Governor Thomas informed the Pennsylvania Council that traders living at Allegheny had been advised by some friends of theirs among the Indians to leave "in order to avoid being murdered by the Indians, who had come to the resolution of cutting off all the white people." The Governor concluded that Peter Chartier had been spreading rumors in order to frighten traders who were still bringing quantities of rum into the Allegheny communities. In 1745 Chartier, dissatisfied with the Pennsylvania government's unwillingness to restrict the sale of alcohol to Native Americans, led Neucheconeh, Meshemethequater and over 400 Pekowi Shawnees out of Pennsylvania to found the community of Eskippakithiki in Kentucky.

=== Visit by Céloron de Blainville, 1749 ===
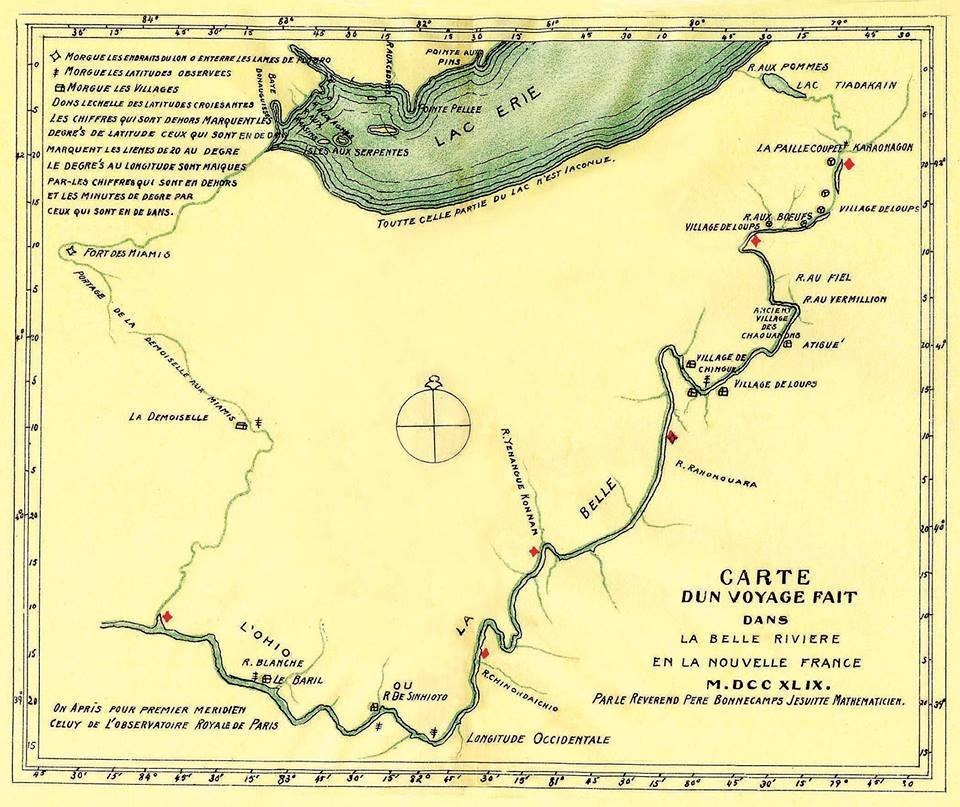
Map of the route followed by Pierre Joseph Céloron de Blainville along the Ohio River in 1749, drawn by Joseph Pierre de Bonnecamps, showing "Atigué" (Kittanning).

In the summer of 1749 Pierre Joseph Céloron de Blainville, leading a force of eight officers, six cadets, an armorer, 20 soldiers, 180 Canadians, 30 Iroquois and 25 Abenakis, moved down the Ohio River on a flotilla of 23 large boats and birch-bark canoes, on his "lead plate expedition", burying lead plates at six locations where major tributaries entered the Ohio and nailing copper plates bearing royal arms to trees to claim the territory for New France.

Céloron arrived at Kittanning, which he referred to as "Attigué", on 6 August 1749. He found the village of 22 cabins (probably wickiups) abandoned except for a Lenape chief and two young men. Through his interpreter Philippe-Thomas Chabert de Joncaire, Céloron told them, "I come only to speak to the nations of the Beautiful River (the Ohio), to animate the children of the (French) government which inhabit it." Céloron gave this chief wampum belts to deliver to the villages lower down as an invitation to hear Céloron speak at a council he was planning to hold in the nearby village of Chiningué (Logstown). He requested that anyone attending his council should "remain quiet upon their mats [listen attentively without interrupting], since I only came to treat of affairs with them, which would be advantageous to them."

=== Captives ===
At the beginning of the French and Indian War, the defeat of General Edward Braddock in July 1755 left Pennsylvania without a professional military force. Shingas and Captain Jacobs launched dozens of Shawnee and Delaware raids against British colonial settlements, killing and capturing hundreds of colonists and destroying settlements across western and central Pennsylvania. Kittanning was used as a staging point for these raids, where warriors would gather to prepare and where prisoners were brought immediately afterwards. At the time of the Kittanning Expedition in September 1756, up to a hundred prisoners may have been temporarily held at Kittanning. Accounts of some captives mentioned their visit to the village, including:

- James Smith probably spent three weeks in June 1755, at Kittanning, which he does not name, but refers to as "an Indian town that was on the north side of the [Allegheny] River, about forty miles above Fort Duquesne.
- Charles Stuart and his wife and children, along with about 13 other captives taken at the Great Cove massacre, were taken to Kittanning in November 1755, and after being forced to run the gauntlet, spent one night there before being given as a gift to a Wyandot chief and sent to Ohio.
- Marie Le Roy and Barbara Leininger, both age 12, were held at Kittanning from December 1755 until the day the village was attacked and destroyed:

We remained at Kittanny until the month of September, 1756. The Indians gave us enough to do. We had to tan leather to make shoes (moccasins), to clear land, to plant corn, to cut down trees, to build hutts, to wash and cook. The want of provisions, however, caused us the greatest suffering. During all the time we were at Kittanny we had neither lard nor salt, and sometimes we were forced to live on acorns, roots, grass and bark. There was nothing in the world to make this new sort of food palatable, excepting hunger itself. In the month of September, Colonel Armstrong arrived and attacked Kittanny town. Both of us happened to be in that part of it that lies on the other side of the river. We were immediately conveyed ten miles further into the interior, in order that we might have no chance of trying, on this occasion, to escape. The savages threatened to kill us ... After the English had withdrawn, we were again brought back to Kittanny, which town had been burned to the ground.

- John Cox or Coxe, 18, reported that he and his brother Richard, and another man named John Craig, were taken in early February, 1756 by Delaware Indians,

... and brought to Kittanning "on the Ohio." On his way hither he met Captain Jacobs and 15 men, whose design was to destroy the settlements on Conococheague Creek. When [Coxe] arrived at Kittanning, he saw about 100 fighting men of the Delaware tribe, with their families, and about 50 English prisoners, consisting of men, women and children. During his stay here Shingas' and Jacobs' parties returned ... The warriors held a war council which, with their war dances, continued a week, when Captain Jacobs left with 48 men, intending, as Coxe was told, to fall upon the inhabitants at Paxtang.

Cox was later taken to Tioga, Pennsylvania and managed to escape to Fort Augusta on 14 August 1756.

- About 21 captives taken after the attack on Fort McCord on 1 April 1756 were brought to Kittanning, arriving on 12 April, according to the 1760 account of Jean Lowry, who was one of the prisoners. They stayed only one night before going to Fort Machault.
- George Woods, (father-in-law of Pennsylvania senator James Ross), was captured during the assault on Fort Bigham on 11 June 1756. After running the gauntlet, Woods was adopted into the tribe. He reportedly bargained with his captors to pay an annual fee of ten pounds of tobacco for life, in exchange for his freedom. Eventually Woods was taken to Fort Pitt and released.
- Simon Girty, then only 15 years old, was captured when Fort Granville was taken by the French and Indians in July 1756, and taken to Kittanning with his stepfather, his mother, and his brothers Thomas, John, George, and James Girty. There he had to witness the torture and death of his stepfather, John Turner. His older brother Thomas was one of the seven prisoners rescued by Colonel Armstrong, although Simon, his mother and his other brothers remained in captivity. Simon was released by order of Colonel Henry Bouquet in November 1764. Later he fought on both sides during the American Revolutionary War and took part in several other campaigns.
- Hugh Gibson, 14, was captured in July 1756, by Delaware Indians, outside Robinson's Fort, near present-day Southwest Madison Township, Pennsylvania. His mother and a neighbor were killed by the Indians, and he was brought to Kittanning, where he was adopted by Shingas' brother Pisquetomen, a Delaware chief (who Gibson refers to as "Bisquittam"). Gibson was living in Kittanning when Armstrong's attack began, and asked Pisquetomen what he should do. Pisquetomen told him to stay with the women. After the attack, he was forced to witness the torture of a woman who had attempted to escape with Armstrong's men. Gibson was then taken to Saucunk, and later to Muskingum. In March 1759, he escaped, together with Marie Le Roy, Barbara Leininger and David Brackenridge, a Scotsman, and walked 250 miles to Fort Pitt (then under construction).

By the summer of 1756, over three thousand colonists had been killed or captured in Pennsylvania, Virginia and the Carolinas. Numerous settlements had been burned or abandoned. Between Braddock's defeat in July 1755 and the raid on Kittanning in September 1756, Native American war parties conducted at least seventy-eight raids in Pennsylvania, killing 484 Pennsylvanians and capturing at least 202.

=== Destruction, 1756 ===
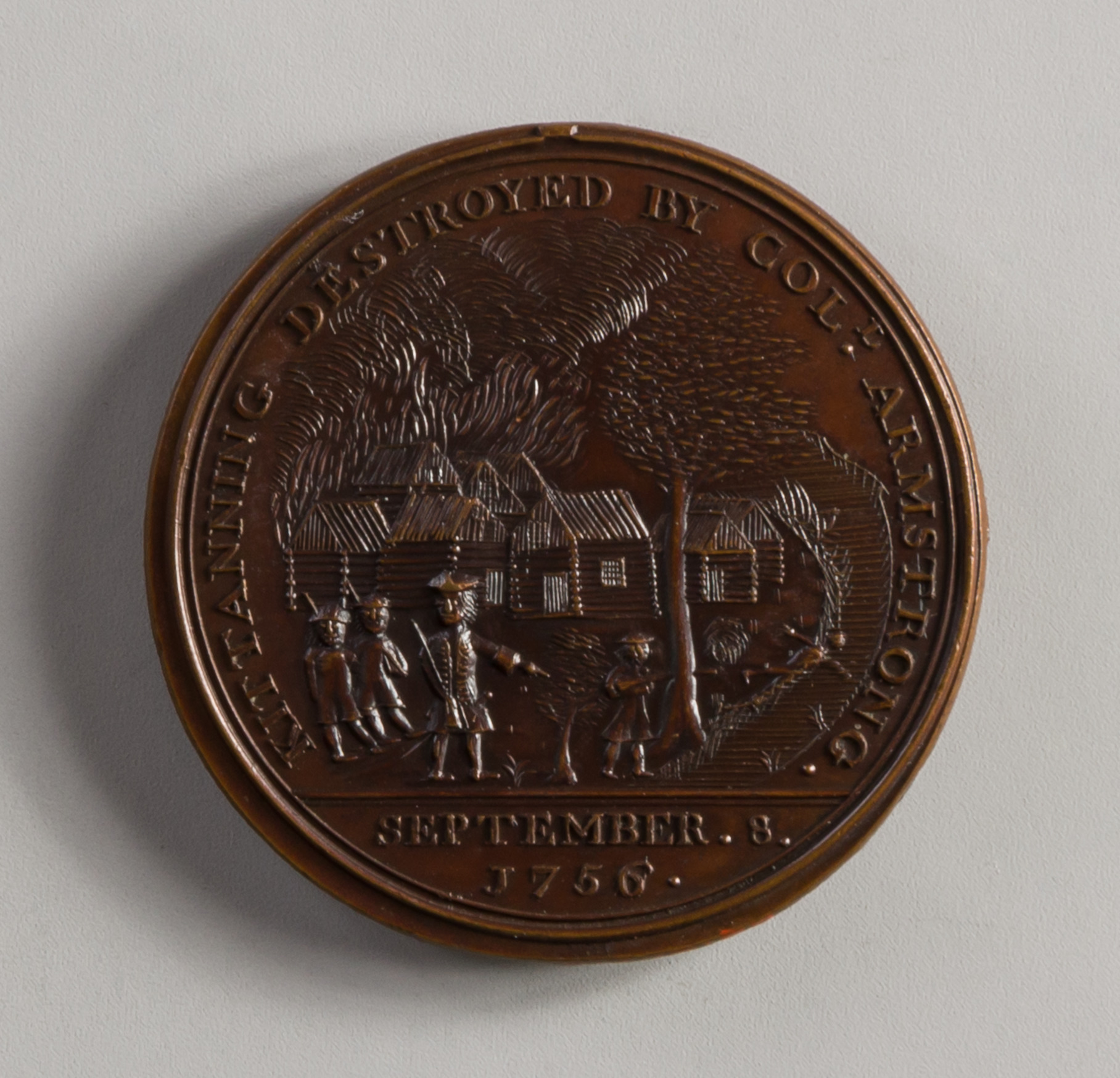
Medal issued to commemorate Kittanning's destruction.

In response, Governor Robert Hunter Morris ordered the construction of forts garrisoned with colonial militia, and in early 1756 Fort Augusta, Fort Shirley, Fort Lyttleton and Fort Granville were built. However, over a hundred well-supplied Indian warriors, with the support of 55 professional French troops, attacked and burned Fort Granville on 2 August 1756, capturing 27 soldiers and civilians and killing the fort's commander, Lieutenant Edward Armstrong. Governor Morris wanted to launch an attack that would strike into the Indians' home territory and kill one or more of their leaders. Provincial authorities offered a substantial reward for the death of Shingas and Captain Jacobs.

At a council in Carlisle, George Croghan informed Governor Morris that "he had sent a Delaware Indian called Jo Hickman ... to Kittanning ... where he found 140 men, chiefly Delawares and Shawanese, who had then with them above 100 English prisoners, big and little, taken from Virginia and Pennsylvania." A map of Kittanning drawn by John Baker, who was held captive in Kittanning from January 1756 until March, when he escaped, was included in Armstrong's proposal for the raid. It is labelled

Kittanning, a Rough Sketch. John Baker, Soldier at Fort Shierley, who last Winter made his escape from the Indians at the Kittanning, says there are generally near 100 Warriors beside Elderly men and boys at said Town and that more than [100] English prisoners were there when he came off, that the Alleghany Hills will not admit any Road that can be travel'd from the Forts Shirley or Lyttleton to that Town in less than 150 Miles or thereabout.

1755 map by John Mitchell showing "Kittanning, English settlement of some years ago", upper left of map's center.

The map states that the village was "200 perches in length", (about 1005 meters or 3,300 feet) and labels the homes of Shingas (separated from the village on the north bank of the river), Captain Jacobs, Pisquetomen, King Beaver (Tamaqua), John and Joseph (Jo) Hickman, and "Bill's House" (the home of Bill Hickman), as well as a cornfield and a "long house, 30 feet, where frolicks and war dances are held." The map depicts 40 houses, grouped according to clans, set in an arc overlooking the fields, and shows the town as situated to the south of the Allegheny River and to the west of Cowanshannock Creek.

In August, Lieutenant Colonel John Armstrong (brother of Fort Granville's commander) led 300 Pennsylvanian provincial troops on the Kittanning Expedition, attacking and destroying the village on 8 September 1756. Several of the town's houses were destroyed when they caught fire and kegs of gunpowder stored in them exploded: "Nearly thirty houses were fired, and while they were burning, the ears of Col. Armstrong and his men were regaled by the successive discharges of loaded guns, and still more so by the explosion of sundry bags and large kegs of powder stored away in every house."

Little is known of the houses at Kittanning. Robert Robinson's eyewitness account of the battle says that Captain Jacobs barricaded himself and his wife and son inside his cabin, which appears to have been a European-style home with a "garret or cock loft window" from which he attempted to escape after it was set on fire by Lieutenant Robert Callender. Robinson also refers to another "house covered with bark", which may have been a traditional Lenape wickiup.

Armstrong described the

... vast Explosion of sundry Bags and large Cags of Gunpowder wherewith almost every House abounded, the Prisoners afterwards informing that the Indians had frequently said they had a sufficient Stock of Ammunition for ten Years War with the English. With the Rooff of Capt Jacob's House when the Powder blew up, was thrown the Leg & Thigh of an Indian with a Child of three or four Years old such a Height that they ... fell in the adjacent Corn Field. There was also a great Quantity of Goods burnt which the Indians had received in a present but ten Days before from the French.

Robinson notes, "When the Indian magazine blew up in the town...[the] report was heard at Fort Pitt."

After the destruction of the town, many of its inhabitants returned and erected their wigwams on the ashes of their former homes. The town was reoccupied briefly and two of the Pennsylvanian prisoners who had attempted to escape with Armstrong's men were tortured to death. The Indians then harvested their corn and moved to Fort Duquesne, where they requested permission from the French to resettle further to the west, away from British colonists. According to Marie Le Roy and Barbara Leininger, many of Kittanning's inhabitants moved to Saucunk, Kuskusky or Muskingum.

== Fort Armstrong ==
The site was later used as a staging ground for Native American campaigns. In August, 1763, a force of Delaware, Shawnee, Mingo, and Huron warriors assembled at the site before attacking Colonel Henry Bouquet at the Battle of Bushy Run.

In 1774, the militia of Hannastown, Pennsylvania was briefly stationed at the site of the village, which was still uninhabited. Arthur St. Clair suggested in a letter the construction of a "stockade fort, and of laying out a town at the Kittanning, as the basis for the Indian trade on the part of the Province." Governor John Penn responded: "I approve of the measure of laying out a town in the Proprietary Manor at Kittanning, to accommodate the Traders and other inhabitants who may chuse to reside there, and therefore I inclose you an Order for that purpose. But I cannot, without the concurrence of the Assembly, give any directions for erecting a Stockade." The project to build a town was not put into action, but the site was used by the 8th Pennsylvania Regiment as a transient military camp from 15 July to 15 September 1776 during the American Revolutionary War.

In March 1779 George Washington sent Colonel Moses Rawlings from Fort Frederick in Maryland to "take post at Kittanning and immediately throw up a stockade fort for the security of the convoys." This project was given to Lieutenant Colonel Daniel Brodhead, who wrote to Washington on 24 June: "Lt. Colonel Bayard, with 121 Rank and file, is now employed at Erecting a Stockade Fort at Kittanning." On 1 July he wrote to Colonel Bayard: "I think it is a compliment due to Colonel Armstrong to call that fort after him, therefore it is my pleasure that from this time forward it be called Fort Armstrong." On 20 July he wrote to Bayard: "You will order two officers, two sergeants, and twenty-four rank and file of the worst kind to remain at the post." The fort was abandoned on 27 November, as the garrison was needed elsewhere. Attempts were made to re-establish a garrison there, but due to difficulties in providing food and supplies, this was never done. In July 1782, Seneca Indian warriors led by Guyasuta gathered at the site in preparation for their attack on Hannastown, Pennsylvania.

Ruins of the fort, including a well, were still visible as late as 1875.

== See also ==
- Shingas
- Captain Jacobs
- Kittanning Path
- John Armstrong, Sr.
- Kittanning Expedition
- Kittanning, Pennsylvania
