= Opessa Straight Tail =

Pekowi Shawnee chief

- Born: Wapatha c. 1664; Indiana or Illinois
- Died: before 1750 (aged 86); Logstown
- Years active: 1693–1727
- Known for: Promoting peaceful coexistence with English colonists
- Parent: Straight Tail Meaurroway Opessa (1630–1709) (father)

Opessa Straight Tail (c. 1664 – c. 1750), also known as Wopatha or Wapatha, was a Pekowi Shawnee Chief. He was the son of Straight Tail Meaurroway Opessa. He is best known for signing, on 23 April 1701, the "Articles of friendship and agreement between William Penn and the Susquehannah, Shawonah, and North Patomack Indians," that designated lands and conditions of coexistence between those tribes and the English settlers.

== Birth and early life ==
His exact place of birth is unknown, but was most likely in either what is today Indiana or Illinois. He was living with his father in what is today Illinois in 1674 when his village was visited by Louis Jolliet and later by René-Robert Cavelier, Sieur de La Salle, accompanied by Martin Chartier. In 1674 Chartier married Opessa's sister Sewatha Straight Tail (1660–1759). Chartier led a mutiny against La Salle in 1680 and became an outlaw, fleeing first to upstate New York, but later returning to live with Opessa's family at Starved Rock (later known as Fort St. Louis). Chartier returned to his home in Montreal, but in 1685 rejoined Opessa's family on the Cumberland River in Tennessee. The band spent a summer at the future site of Pittsburgh, Pennsylvania, then crossed the Alleghenies and traveled along the Susquehanna River. Opessa's niece Mary Seaworth (Sewatha) Chartier (1687–1732) was born in Frederick County, Virginia in 1687.

In 1689, the band moved to French Lick on the Cumberland River in northeastern Tennessee, near the present-day site of Nashville, Tennessee, where Opessa's nephew Peter Chartier was born in 1690. In the spring of 1692, the Shawnee and a group of Susquehannock (Conestoga) Indians migrated to Cecil County, Maryland on the Chesapeake Bay. The Shawnee were relocating after a series of violent conflicts with Illinois and Miami Indians.

== Role as Shawnee leader ==
Opessa by this time had become a Shawnee leader, as his father was preparing to retire as chief. In 1694 he petitioned the Maryland Provincial Government for permission for a group of about 700 Shawnees from Carolina to settle in Maryland, after they had fled a conflict with the Catawbas there. But the provincial authorities were suspicious of Opessa's brother-in-law Martin Chartier and he was arrested, spending several months in jail in St. Mary's and Anne Arundel Counties as "a spy or party with designs of mischief," before a court determined that he was not working for the Government of New France. The Shawnees remained at Bohemia Manor as guests of Casperus Augustine Herman, son of Augustine Herman.

Nonetheless, the Shawnees felt unwelcome in Maryland and in 1694 they moved north into Pennsylvania and eventually settled at a place known as Chartier's Old Town (on the site of what is now Tarentum, Pennsylvania). In 1697 Opessa succeeded Straight Tail as Pekowi Chief in Pequea Township, Pennsylvania.

In 1698 Opessa's band applied to the Conestoga people, and through them, to William Penn for permission to settle permanently on Pequea Creek in Lancaster County. A Shawnee community existed there for the next thirty years, until about 1728 when most Shawnee people began migrating west into the Ohio River Valley.

== Shawnee chief ==
On 23 April 1701 Opessa and chiefs of the Susquehannock, Piscataway and Onondaga tribes signed a treaty with William Penn ceding lands along the Potomac River to the English in return for protection and trade privileges. By this treaty "it was settled that no Indians be suffered to settle on the Susquehanna or Patomack save those already noted [Shawnee, Mingoes and Gawanese]." Opessa and the other chiefs agreed by their "hands and seals," with each other, with William Penn and his successors, and with other inhabitants of the province, "to be as one head and one heart, and to live in true friendship and amity, as one people." More than 50 years afterward, the Shawnee, then in Ohio, still preserved a copy of this treaty.

At a June 1707 Conference at Pequea, Opessa told Governor John Evans that his people were "happy to live in a country at peace, and not as in those parts where we formerly lived, for then, upon our return from hunting, we found our town surprised, and our women and children taken prisoners by our enemies."

On 1 July 1707 Opessa was visited at his home by Governor Evans, who was there to enlist the aid of Opessa's brother-in-law Martin Chartier in the capture and arrest of Nicole Godin, a French trader accused of conspiracy against the Province of Pennsylvania. Opessa had submitted a complaint about the quantity of rum sold by Godin to the Indians. According to Egle, "Opessah had taken a journey to New Castle to remonstrate with the traders who had intercepted their hunters, gave them rum, made them drink, robbed them of their skins, and when they got to [their] wigwam, they were naked and hungry."

On 8 June 1710 Opessa attended a conference at Conestoga, Pennsylvania with Colonel John French and Henry Worley, together with Terrutawanaren and Teonnottein (Tuscarora chiefs), and Civility (a Conestoga chief) to propose a treaty guaranteeing the safety of the Shawnees, Tuscaroras, and Conestogas from "fear of death or slavery," as the kidnapping of Native Americans for sale into slavery was common throughout the colonies at this time. The petition was not well received, however, as the Pennsylvania commissioners blamed the Indians for violence against European settlers.

=== Role in the death of Francis Le Tort ===
On 18 June 1711 Opessa attended a hearing at Conestoga to discuss the murder by several Shawnee warriors from Opessa's band, of Francis Le Tort (son of Jacques Le Tort and often erroneously referred to as "Francis de la Tore"). Le Tort was an indentured servant accused of stealing slaves and was found and killed by Shawnee warriors, but Opessa maintained his innocence, stating that he had attempted to prevent the warriors from pursuing Le Tort. Charles Augustus Hanna states:

Deputy Governor Charles Gookin visited Conestoga with four members of his Council to investigate this murder; and while there, the Senecas gave him the following account of the affair: "That Opessa [chief of the Shawnees], being thereto solicited by John Hansson Steelman, had sent out some of his people, either to bring back or kill Francis Le Tort and his company. Opessa, he affirms, was entirely innocent, for that John Hans came to his cabin, when he and his young people, who were then going a hunting, were in council; told him that some of his slaves and dogs (meaning Le Tort and company) were fled; therefore desired him forthwith to send some of his people to bring them back or kill them, and take goods for their trouble. At which motion, Opessa, being surprised, told him that he ought by no means to discourse after that manner before young people who were going to the woods and might by accident meet these people; and therefore ordered him to desist, utterly denying his request."

Opessa offered this statement in apology for the young man's death:

Were it possible for us, by presents or any other way, to atone for the Lives of those men our young people unadvisedly slew, we would be partly willing to make satisfaction, and such a Condescension would forever be Gratefully remembered and more nearly engage us, and for the future render us more Careful...[I] assure that if hereafter any such thing should happen, [I myself] would be Executioner, and Burn them that should dare to Do it.

Gookin offered a clear absolution to Opessa for his role in Le Tort's death, saying:

The laws of England [are] such that whosoever Kill'd a man must run the same fate; Yet considering the previous circumstances to that murder, the length of time since the action...and [that] all the persons save one (who is absconded) since [are] Dead, I am willing to forbear further prosecution on Enquiry into it, but with all caution you that if any such thing hereafter falls out, you may be assured I know well how to Do Justice as I have now shewed you mercy.

=== Abdication and life with the Lenape ===
After the killing of Francis Le Tort, Opessa abandoned both his chieftainship and his tribe. Hanna reports that he fled for fear of being held responsible by the Haudenosaunee or the English for Le Tort's murder, even after Gookin's pardon. Hanna also reports that he may have been influenced by a Lenape woman whom he loved but who refused to leave her people. Opessa took refuge among the Lenapes of Sassoonan's clan in the village of Shamokin on the Susquehanna River. While there, he married Polly, Sassoonan's daughter. Later he moved to what was called Opessa's Town, on the Potomac, now Oldtown, Maryland. In 1714 he was succeeded as Pekowi Chief by his brother Cakundawanna (b. 1662).

In 1715 Opessa attended a conference in Philadelphia with Sassoonan, using the occasion to reassert the alliance between the Shawnees and the Lenape and advocating for control of rum sales to Native American communities, which were starting to undermine social cohesion due to alcohol-inspired violence and the tendency of men to make poor trade deals when intoxicated.

Although he took on the role of Pekowi chief, Cakundawanna was not recognized by many members of the tribe, as Secretary James Logan reported after meeting him at Conestoga in July, 1720:

"When their king, Opessah...took the government upon him, and the people differed with him, he left them. They had then no chief. Thereupon, some of them applied to him [Cakundawanna] to take that charge upon him; but he had only the name, without any authority, and could do nothing. He counseled them, but they would not obey; therefore, he cannot answer for them."

Logan adds, "there was an interregnum in effect which lasted several years."

On 18 October 1722 Cakundawanna authorized a raid on Opessa's Town to recapture ten escaped slaves who had fled from Virginia. Governor William Keith had received complaints from Virginia Lieutenant Governor Alexander Spotswood that the slaves had taken refuge among the Shawnees, and Cakundawanna pledged to return them, stating "I will go my own self and take assistance where they are not exceeding 10 in number as directed...We will lose no time to perform the taking of them...We must take them by Guile."

=== Return as chief and relocation to Ohio ===
Faced with the prospect of war between the Haudenosaunee and their allies, including the Shawnees, and the Catawbas and their allies, Opessa was urged to return as chief, which he did in 1723, replacing his brother Cakundawanna. Many of his Pekowi Shawnee band followed him to Opessa's Town in Maryland, which became a haven for runaway slaves.

Opessa's community began to break up and migrate westward some time in the mid 1720s, and it is unclear exactly when he left Maryland. Shawnee and Lenape communities were starting to move west into the Ohio River Valley, pushed out of Pennsylvania by the rapidly growing European population and by conflicts over land rights and alcohol, and lured by the efforts of New France to gain Native American influence with trade goods and offers of protection. The new communities of Kittanning (established 1724), Logstown (established 1727) and Lower Shawneetown (established 1734) attracted a multiethnic population made up of smaller social groups: village fragments, extended families, or individuals, often survivors of epidemics and refugees from conflicts with other Native Americans or with Europeans. Opessa and his family relocated to Logstown some time between 1727 and 1750. He probably died soon afterwards.

== Family and children ==
He was uncle by marriage (and father-in-law) of Peter Chartier, son of his sister Sewatha Straight Tail (1660–1759), who married his daughter Blanceneige-Wapakonee Opessa (1695-1737).

Opessa was married first to Margaret Pekowi (b. 1670) in 1684, second to Polly, daughter of Sassoonan (b. 1684) in 1711, after Opessa resigned his chieftainship and took refuge in Shamokin. Father with Margaret of daughter Blanceneige-Wapakonee Opessa (1695-1737), sons Tecoomteh (b. 1698), Wawwaythi (b. 1700), Loyparkoweh (b. 1705) and Lawaquaqua-Pride Opessa (b. 1710). Cannawhehala Wiskeloa Straight Tail (d. 1755) who married William John Gallion (b. 1678) She was the daughter of Polly Sassoonan and Opessa.

== See also ==
- Peter Chartier
- Meshemethequater
- Logstown
- Kakowatcheky
