= Shawnee Old Fields Village Site =

Archaeological site

- U.S. National Register of Historic Places
- Nearest city: Oldtown, Maryland
- Built: 1697
- NRHP reference No.: 75000150
- Added to NRHP: May 12, 1975

The Shawnee Old Fields Village Site, is an archaeological site near Oldtown in Allegany County, Maryland. The site contains Late Woodland and Contact period artifacts. An area between the site and the river's edge may be the location of a number of short-term camps and/or dwelling units. The first confirmed archeological manifestation of the several historically documented Shawnee villages in Maryland. It is believed to have been the home of Chief Opessa Straight Tail, a Shawnee leader.

It was listed on the National Register of Historic Places in 1975.
