= Charles Gookin =

Deputy governor of colonial Pennsylvania

Charles Gookin (c. 1660–c. 1723) was a deputy governor of the Province of Pennsylvania.

== Biography ==
Gookin had been a soldier and bore the title of colonel. He was appointed deputy governor of the Province of Pennsylvania by William Penn, serving from February 1, 1709, until May 31, 1717.

On February 15, 1714, a day chosen for the convening of the assembly, the weather was so poor that a quorum failed to assemble. On the following day, when the group assembled, he reportedly chastised the committee that was sent to him and ordered them to leave his property. He subsequently removed all of the chief justices of New Castle County for taking legal action against his brother-in-law, leaving the county without a magistrate for six weeks.

When the judges of the Supreme Court at New Castle refused to permit a certain commission of his to be published in court during another period of his tenure, he reportedly sent for one of the judges and kicked him. Lawyer Andrew Hamilton was indicted before the Governor's Grand Jury for cursing and arguing against Gookin. The case was subsequently dismissed. The breach made by his eccentricities widened until 1717, when, on petition of the council, he was removed. One of Penn's letters says: "His grandfather, Sir Vincent Gookin, had been an early great planter in Ireland in Kings James I. and Charles I. days."
