= Shikellamy =

Native American chief

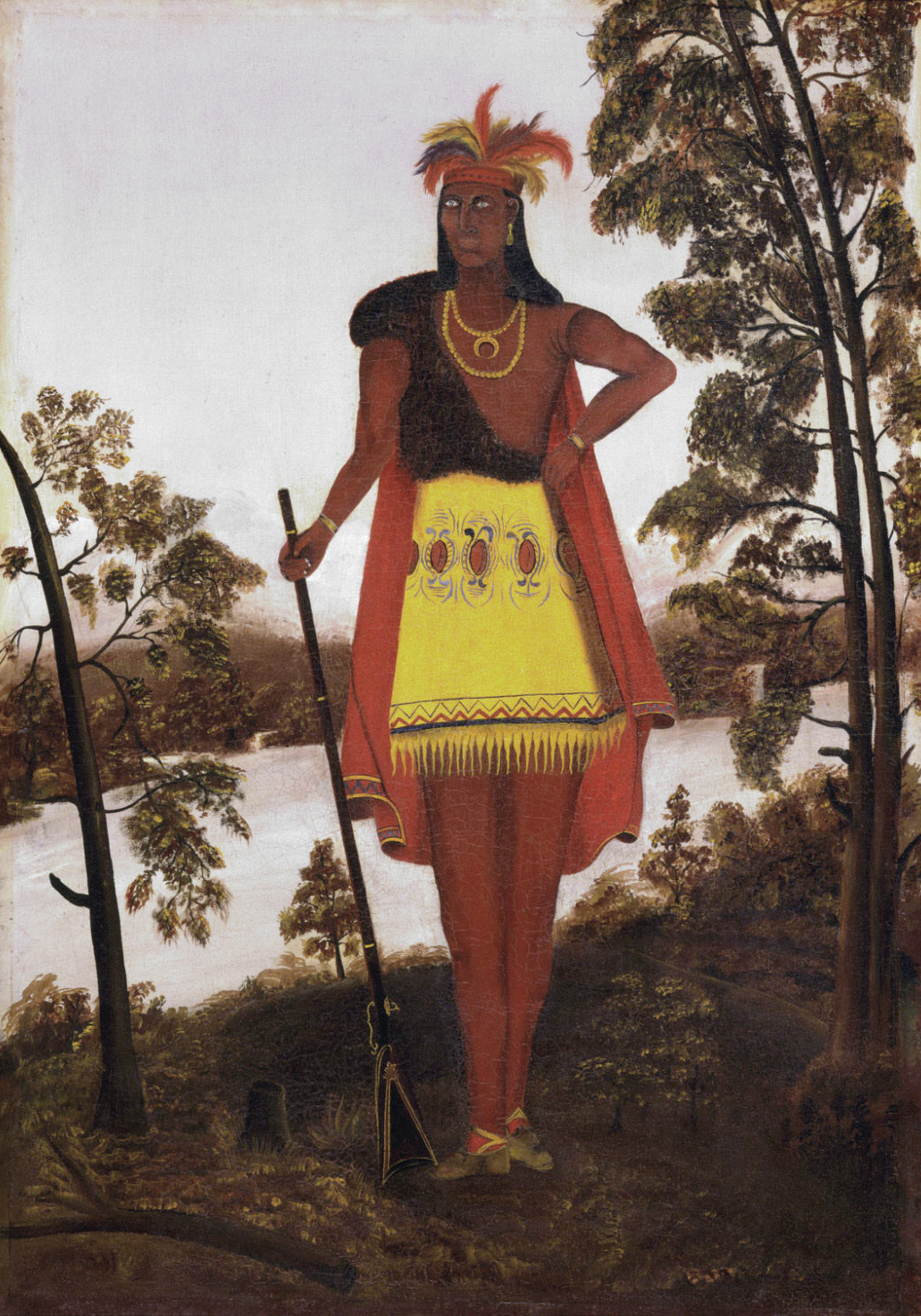
- 1820 painting by an anonymous artist
- Born: Unknown
- Died: December 6, 1748; Shamokin
- Occupation: Oneida chief
- Children: Logan, Tachnechtoris, "The Spreaking Oak" AKA John Skikellamy or Captain Logan, Second son Tah-gah-jute or Sayughtowa AKA James Logan, third son Arahhot or "Unhappy Jake", 4th son John Petty or Sagogeghyata, daughter widow of Cajadies

Shikellamy (died December 6, 1748), also spelled Shickellamy and also known as Swatana, was an Oneida chief and overseer for the Haudenosaunee Confederacy. In his position as chief and overseer, Shikellamy served as a supervisor for the Six Nations, overseeing the Shawnee and Lenape tribes in central Pennsylvania along the Susquehanna River and protecting the southern border of the Haudenosaunee Confederacy. While his birth date is not known, his first recorded historical appearance was in Philadelphia in 1728. In 1728 he was living in a Shawnee village in Pennsylvania near modern Milton, and moved in 1742 to the village of Shamokin, modern day Sunbury, at the confluence of the West and North Branches of the Susquehanna. Shikellamy was an important figure in the early history of the Province of Pennsylvania and served as a go-between for the colonial government in Philadelphia and the Haudenosaunee chiefs in Onondaga. He welcomed Conrad Weiser to Shamokin and served as Weiser's guide on his journeys into the frontier of Pennsylvania and New York.

== Emissary for the Haudenosaunee in Pennsylvania ==
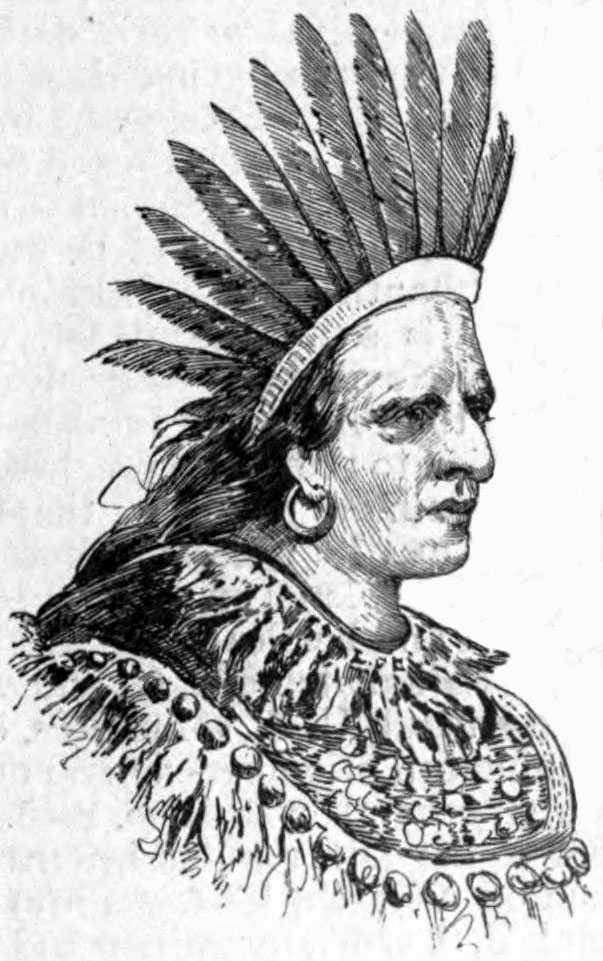
Shikellamy's portrait from the Appletons' article on “Swatane”

Although it is not known when or where Shikellamy was born, his first appearance in the historical record is his 1728 visit to Philadelphia, the provincial capital of Pennsylvania. The Quaker leadership in Philadelphia soon realized that Shikellamy was an important Indian leader and he was invited back to the capital in 1729. He was described as "Shekallamy,...a trusty good Man & great Lover of the English." Shikellamy was sent by the government of Pennsylvania to invite the leaders of the Haudenosaunee Confederacy to a council in 1732. The initial meeting was a success and both sides agreed to meet once again in the future. These meetings were arranged by Conrad Weiser and Shikellamy.

It has been said, though, that Shikellamy came from France, but was captured by Indians as a boy. Others say that he was all Indian, and was a descendant of the Andastes.

During a later meeting, Shikellamy, Weiser and the Pennsylvanians negotiated a 1736 treaty in Philadelphia, including a deed whereby the Haudenosaunee sold the land drained by the Delaware River and south of the Blue Mountain. Since the Haudenosaunee had never until then laid claim to this land, this purchase represented a significant swing in Pennsylvanian policy toward the Native Americans. William Penn had never taken sides in disputes between tribes, but by this purchase, the Pennsylvanians were favoring the Haudenosaunee over the Lenape. Along with the Walking Purchase of 1737, also arranged with the assistance of Shikellamy and Conrad Weiser, this treaty exacerbated Pennsylvania-Lenape relations. The results of this policy shift would help induce the Lenapes to side with the French during the French and Indian Wars, which would result in many colonial deaths. It did, however, help induce the Haudenosaunee to continue to side with the British over the French.

== A friend to Christian missionaries ==
Shikellamy had originally lived in a Shawnee village in the vicinity of modern Milton, along the West Branch Susquehanna River. The Shawnee moved to the west by 1742, and in that year Shikellamy moved to Shamokin village, which was an important Lenape town and home of Sassoonan (also known as Allumapees), a leader who was regarded by Pennsylvania authorities as the Delaware (Lenape) "king." This title had no traditional meaning for the Delawares, who lived in autonomous villages. However, since British colonial governments preferred to deal with a single leader rather than numerous village elders, Sassoonan emerged as the Delaware "king". Pennsylvania officials found Sassoonan useful because he could be induced (with the help of gifts and abundantly free liquor) to sign away Indian lands.

Shikellamy was rewarded for his efforts in the Walking Purchase and other treaties by the colonial government of Pennsylvania. In 1744 Conrad Weiser supervised the construction of a house for Shikellamy at Shamokin. The house was 49.5 feet (15.1 m) long, 17.5 feet (5.3 m) wide, and was covered with a shingle roof.

Shikellamy's position and status at Shamokin made him an important person in the eyes of the Moravian missionaries who sought to spread the gospel to the Indians of Pennsylvania. Count Zinzendorf, a bishop of Moravian Church and native of Germany, visited with him in 1742. The Count believed that Shikellamy, who had converted to Christianity, could serve as a vital agent of change in converting all Indians to the Christian faith. Shikellamy permitted the Moravians to maintain an outpost at Shamokin and served as an emissary between the Moravians and Madame Montour's village of Otstonwakin at the mouth of Loyalsock Creek and French Margaret's village at the mouth of Lycoming Creek. Shikellamy permitted the Moravians to stay at Shamokin because he believed that they had the Indians' best interest at heart. He knew that, unlike other white men, the Moravians had no interest in the Indians' furs and did not want to take their land, nor did the missionaries give Shikellamy's people any alcohol. Shikellamy so admired the Moravians that he permitted them to stay in his home, lent them horses for work, and helped them build their homes. Although the exact date of Shikellamy's earlier conversion to Christianity is unknown, he formally converted to Christianity in November 1748 at the Moravian city of Bethlehem. On his return journey Shikellamy became ill. Despite the efforts of his Moravian friends at Shamokin, the Indian leader succumbed to the illness on December 6, 1748.

== Family ==
Historians are more or less in agreement that Shikellamy, the Oneida Chief, had four or five sons, and at least one daughter. The oldest son Tachnechtoris, "The Spreading Oak" known to the white men as John Shikellamy; and in Jones' History of the Juniata Valley, known as Captain Logan. The second son, Tah-gah-jute or Sayughtowa, meaning "his eyebrows stick out and over", hence spying or "The Beetling Brow," better known as James Logan, renamed for Secretary Logan of Germantown, the Secretary of the Provincial Council, but in later life and to history-Logan, the Mingo. Another son was Arahhot, probably identical with "Unhappy Jake" who was killed in the war with the Catawbas in 1744. John Petty or Sogogeghyata, was the youngest of the four brothers, and bore the name of a Shamokin Indian Trader. Dr John W Jordan states that a fifth son was also killed in battle. Shikellamy also had a daughter, the widow of Cajadies, known as "the best hunter among all the Indians" who died in November 1747. Shikellamy's wife is known as Neanoma, a Cayuga whom he married in New York State a dozen years before removing to Pennsylvania. The children taking the clan or tribe of the mother are referred to as Cayugas as was the tradition.

After his death, Shikellamy was succeeded by his son John Shikellamy, also known as John Logan and Tachnachdoarus (spreading oak). Another one of Shikellamy's sons, James Logan, was named for James Logan, the Quaker Provincial Secretary of Pennsylvania and de facto Superintendent of Indian Affairs. One of these two sons — historians have disagreed which one — later became well known in American history as "Chief Logan," who played a pivotal role in Dunmore's War in 1774 and issued an oft-quoted speech known as "Logan's Lament." A third son was named John Petty, after a trader. Two of his sons were killed in battle.

Statement of Jesse Logan, aged 106 years old and Great Grandson of Chief Shikellamy

Cornplanter Reservation, Penn
October 9, 1915
"I was born on the West Bank of the Allegheny River, in the Cornplanter Reservation, in 1809, the same year as Abraham Lincoln. My father was John Logan, Jr., a Cayuga, the only surviving child of Captain John Logan, the oldest son of Shikellamy. My mother was a daughter of the Seneca Chief Cornplanter. My father after retiring from the war path, settled at Cold Spring, in the Allegheny Reservation, in New York State, where he died in 1844 aged 100 years. Early in life he married Annie, a daughter of Cornplanter, who bore him fine children, three daughters and two sons. The last were names Lyman and Jesse. When my grandfather was old he came to this Reservation, where he lived with my father until his death. To the best of my knowledge, he died in this reservation, and is buried near the grave of Chief Cornplanter. I married Susan, a Seneca maid, and we had one child, James Logan, who died at the age of thirty. He was named for my great-uncle, the immortal Cayuga orator. Physically, my father and my son were small men, much smaller than my grandfather and my great-uncle. I took after my grandfather, as I am of large stature. I remember Cornplanter, my maternal grandfather, very well. He was a large, strong man, not dark in color, and with grey eyes. He was a great man for work. Every morning, winter or summer, rain or shine, at six o'clock he would come out of his house and ring a big dinner bell as a signal for all to get busy. He wore a red cap much the same as the white hunters do now. I remember Philip Tomb, the great elk and panther hunter, who lived a mile up the river. I hunted elk with the famous Jim Jacobs many times. I was taught to hunt by my grandfather, who died in 1820. He was a very old man when I was very young, but I recall what he looked like. I killed hundreds of elk, many bear and deer, and quite a few panthers, the last in 1860. I have always been fond of sports. I walk two miles to town (Corydon) every time there is a baseball game. As a boy I excelled at the Indian games of long ball and snow snake. I love a joke and enjoy a good dinner. I use tobacco and liquor sparingly. I attribute my long life to my love of outdoor exercise and hunting and fishing. In my old age I am well cared for by my Indian friends, but regret that 'my blood flows not in any living person,' to use the language of my great-uncle James. There are many Logans in the Reservations in Pennsylvania and New York; some are descended from my brother and sisters, others adopted the name because of the honor attached to it. I wish I had been invited to attend the unveiling of my great-grandfather's [Shikellamy's] monument in Sunbury next week, but I guess that the world has forgotten Logan. I tried to fight for the white man in the Civil War, but when I got to Harrisburg I was sent back as too old. But I was a dead shot, and can still beat men one-quarter of my age with the gun and bow and arrow. Next summer, if I live I hope to visit Logan Valley, where my grandfather resided, and view the scenes that my father loved to talk about. I would also like to visit Mrs. Gross, at Fort Augusta, who has done so much to honor Shikellamy's memory. I have lived a long while, but I am not tired of life, and each day seems new and pleasant to me."

== Legacy ==
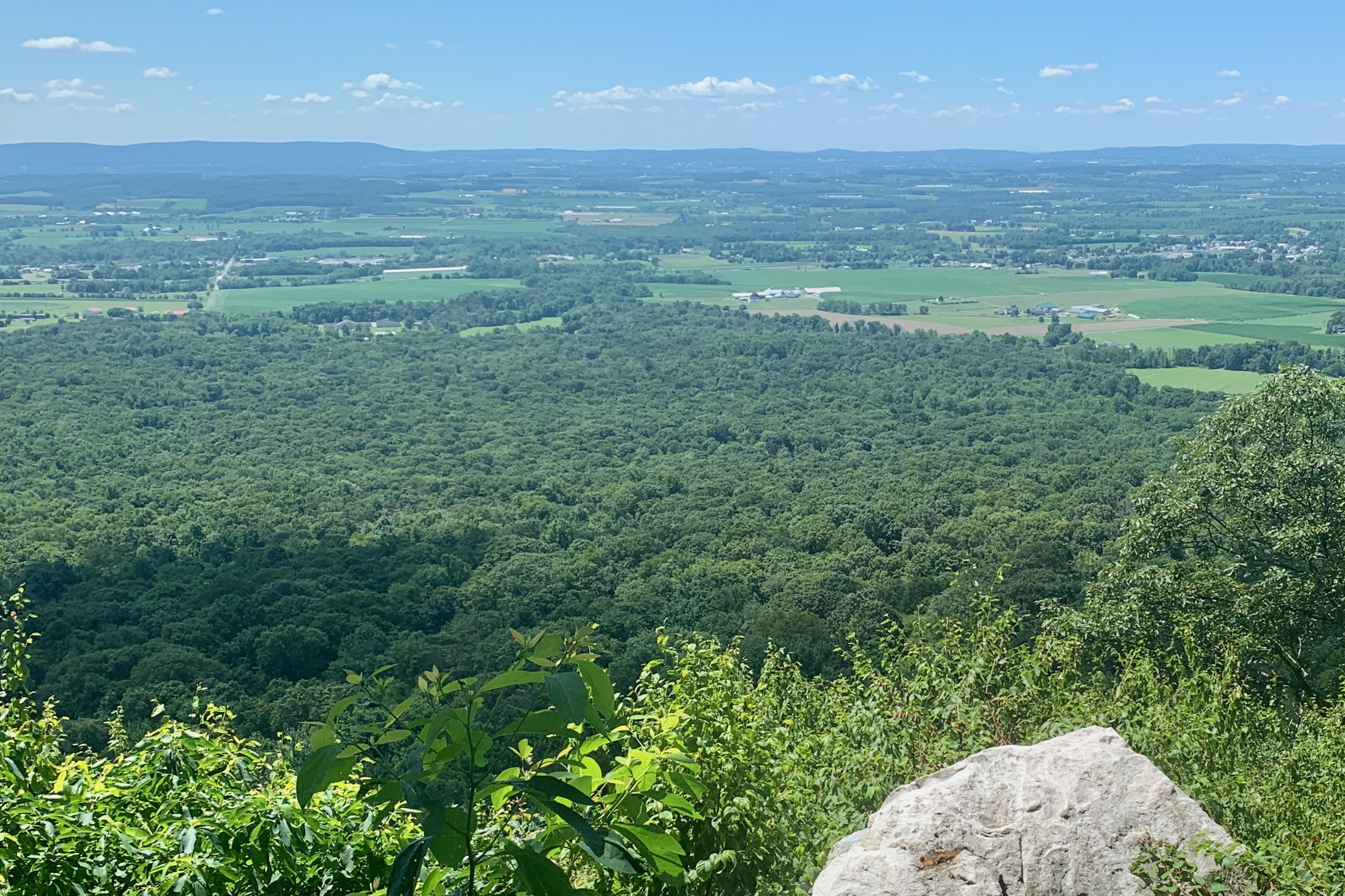
View of Berks County from Shikellamy Summit

Shikellamy is a prominent name in Northumberland County today. Shikellamy State Park, Shikellamy High School, and Chief Shikellamy Elementary School carry on his name. In fact, the Shikellamy School District, which owns and operates both of the aforementioned schools, was named after him when the Commonwealth of Pennsylvania commissioned it in 1964. In Berks County, there was a local Boy Scout camp named after Shikellamy (Shikellamy Scout Reservation) that closed in 1978. Above the camp, there is a rock outlook named Shikellamy Summit along the Appalachian Trail.
