= Indian Old Fields, Kentucky =

Indian Old Fields
- Unincorporated community
- Location within the state of Kentucky Indian Old Fields (the United States)
- Coordinates: 37°56′45″N 84°00′00″W
- Country: United States
- State: Kentucky
- County: Clark
- Elevation: 768 ft (234 m)
- Time zone: UTC-6 (Central (CST))
  - Summer (DST): UTC-5 (CST)
- GNIS feature ID

Indian Old Fields was an unincorporated community located in Clark County, Kentucky, United States.

The community takes its name from the Indian old field present when white settlers arrived. They discovered the Native American settlement of Eskippakithiki, believed to be the last Indian village in Kentucky. It was also named Indian Old Corn Field. It was established by Peter Chartier, the leader of a band of Shawnee, sometime in 1745.

== See also ==
- Eskippakithiki
