= Montour =

Montour may refer to:

== Places in the United States ==
- Montour, Iowa
- Montour, New York
- Montour Falls, New York
- Montour County, Pennsylvania
- Montour Lake, in Montour County, Pennsylvania
- Montour Run, a tributary of Fishing Creek in Columbia County, Pennsylvania
- Montour Township, Pennsylvania
- Montour Trail, a rail trail near Pittsburgh, Pennsylvania
- Montour School District, near Pittsburgh, Pennsylvania
  - Montour High School, in the above school district
- Montour Railroad, a railroad in Pennsylvania

== People ==
- Montour family
  - Madame Montour (1667 or c. 1685 – c. 1753), Algonquin / French Canadian leader
    - Andrew Montour (c. 1720 – 1772), mixed (Oneida and Algonkin/French) leader, son of Madame Montour
      - Nicholas Montour (1756–1808), Canadian Métis politician, son of Andrew Montour
- Catharine Montour (died after 1791), Iroquois leader
- Brandon Montour (born 1994), Canadian ice hockey player
