= Montour family =

American family

The Montour family is a family of Native American and French descent that was prominent in colonial New York and Pennsylvania before and during the American Revolution. Because of the Haudenosaunee (Iroquois) practice of reckoning descent through the female line, the family is known as "Montour" after the matriarch.

== Madam Montour ==
Madam Montour (1667–c.1753). Information on Madam Montour is fragmentary and contradictory. Even her given name is uncertain.

According to her own account:

she was born in Canada, whereof her father (who was a French gentleman) had been Governor; under whose administration the then Five Nations of Indians had made war against the French, and the Hurons and that government (whom we term the French Indians, from espousing their part against the English, and living in Canada) and that, in the war, she was taken by some of the Five Nations’ warriors, being then about ten years of age, and by them was carried away into their country, where she was habited and brought up in the same manner as their children.

Current research indicates that she was born Élisabeth (or Isabelle) Couc around 1667, in Trois-Rivières, Quebec, the daughter of Pierre Couc (ethnic French) and Marie Mitouamegoukoue (Algonquin).

She was apparently married three times, the last to an Oneida man named Carondawanna (Karontowá:nen—Big Tree). He later took the English name "Robert Hunter" after the Governor of New York, whom he met at the Albany Conference of 1711. Madam Montour had at least several children with Carondawanna:

- Andrew (Sattelihu)
- Margaret, known as French Margaret
- a daughter, who may have been named Catherine
- Lewis (Tau-weson)
- Henry (most sources say Henry and Andrew were the same person: "Andrew Montour who by the name of Henry Montour,"—from his land grant)

Carondawanna was killed about 1729 in battle with the Catawba; after the death of her husband, Montour moved with her family to Otstonwakin, on the Lawi-sahquick (Loyalsock Creek), now Montoursville, Lycoming County, Pennsylvania.

She served as interpreter on several occasions, notably Albany in 1711, and Philadelphia in 1727. Her skills were highly valued such that in 1719 the Commissioners for Indian Affairs in Albany decreed that she should receive "a man's pay."

== Andrew Montour ==
Andrew Montour (c. 1720–1772) was the eldest son of Madam Montour. He was commissioned a captain by the British in 1754 during the French and Indian War. Later he commanded of a raiding party in Ohio in 1764 during Pontiac's Rebellion (1763-1766). He was granted land in Pennsylvania by the colonial government. He married Sally Ainse. His son John served on the side of the colonists in the American Revolution. Another son, Nicholas, became a wealthy businessman and landowner in Canada.

== Margaret Montour ==
Margaret Montour, (1690–), also known as French Margaret, the eldest daughter (some say niece) of Madam Montour, married Katarioniecha (Peter Quebeck), a Mohawk. They resided at a village called on a 1759 map "French Margaret's Town" (Wenschpochkechung), on the west branch of the Susquehanna at the mouth of Lycoming Creek (now Williamsport, Pennsylvania). The couple had at least five children:

- Catherine (French Catherine)
- Esther (Queen Esther)
- Nicholas
- a son who was killed around 1753 fighting the Creek
- Mary, or Molly.

Like her mother, Margaret Montour attended treaty conferences and often interpreted.

== Lewis Montour ==
Lewis Montour, the son of Madam Montour, was killed during the French and Indian War.

== Catherine Montour ==
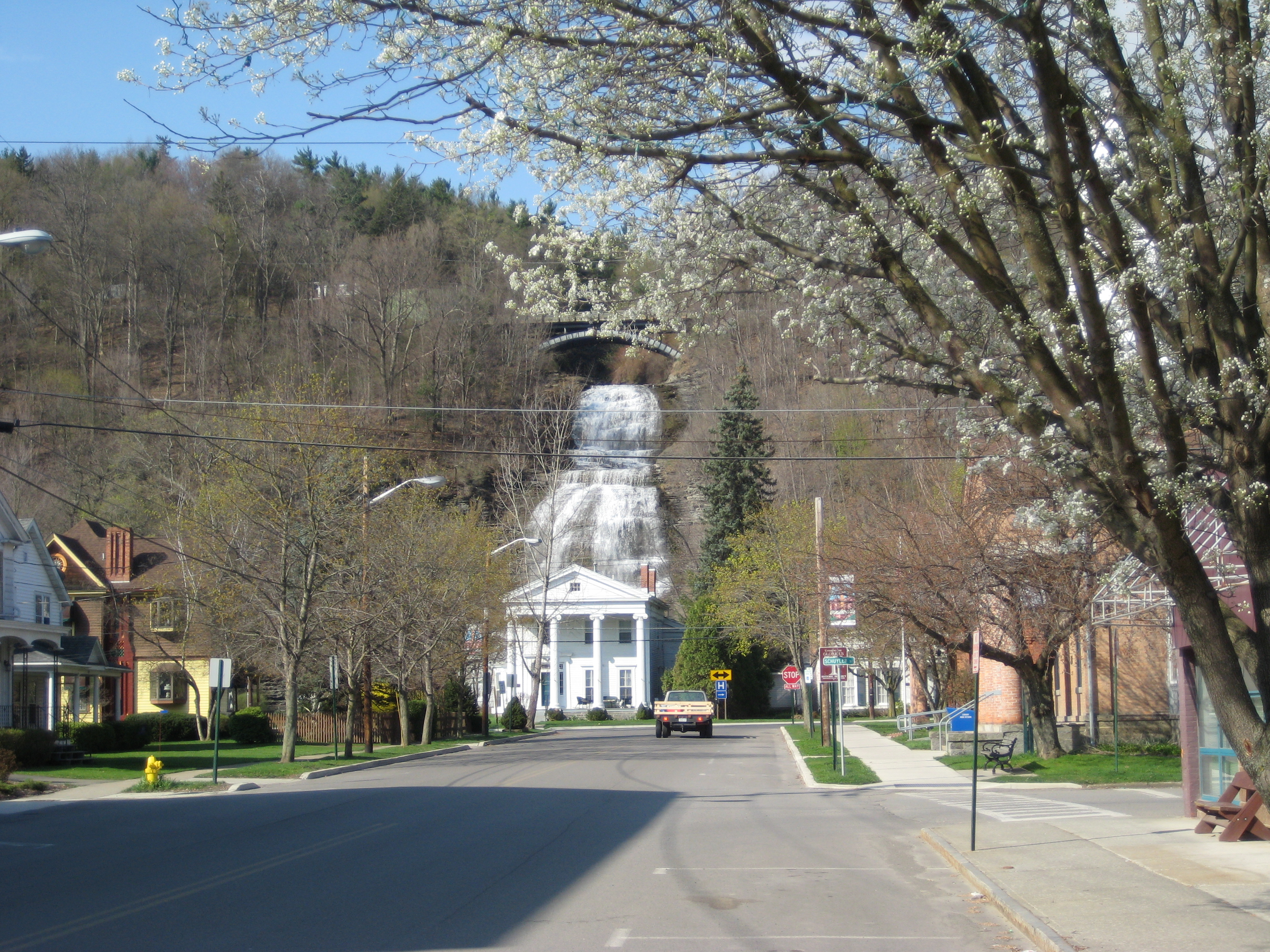
Shequaga Falls in the present-day village of Montour Falls, New York near the site of Catherine's Town

Catherine Montour (1710–c.1780), or French Catherine, was the daughter of French Margaret. She married Thomas Huston or Hudson (Telenemut). Their children were Roland, John, Amochol(son), and Belle. Catherine died c. 1780-81. Her home was a large village at the head of Seneca Lake, New York called Shequaga, or Catherine's Town.

== Esther Montour ==
Esther Montour, (c.1720–), called Queen Esther, was the eldest daughter of French Margaret. She married Echogohund, chief of the Munsee Delaware, and became their leader following his death. Her home was at Sheshequin (now Ulster Township, Pennsylvania).

During the American Revolution, she was present at the Battle of Wyoming (also known as the Wyoming Massacre) in 1778. According to some sources, enraged by the death of her son two days earlier, she participated in the torture and murder of thirty or so of the enemy; one source stated, "she was the most infuriated demon in that carnival of blood." Others dispute this, saying either that reports of atrocities were propaganda, or that Esther did not participate. According to one story, she was killed by Thomas Hartley later that year. But other sources state that she died around 1800 on Cayuga Lake in New York.

== Mary Montour ==
Mary Montour was the daughter of French Margaret Montour. She married Kanaghragait (John Cook), called "The White Mingo" (died 1790). Mary was baptized in Philadelphia by a Catholic priest. In 1791, when the Moravian mission moved from New Salem (Petquotting) to Canada, Mary accompanied them. She was fluent in "English, French, Mohawk (her mother tongue), Wyandot [Huron], Ottawa, Chippewa, Shawnese, and Delaware."

== Roland Montour ==
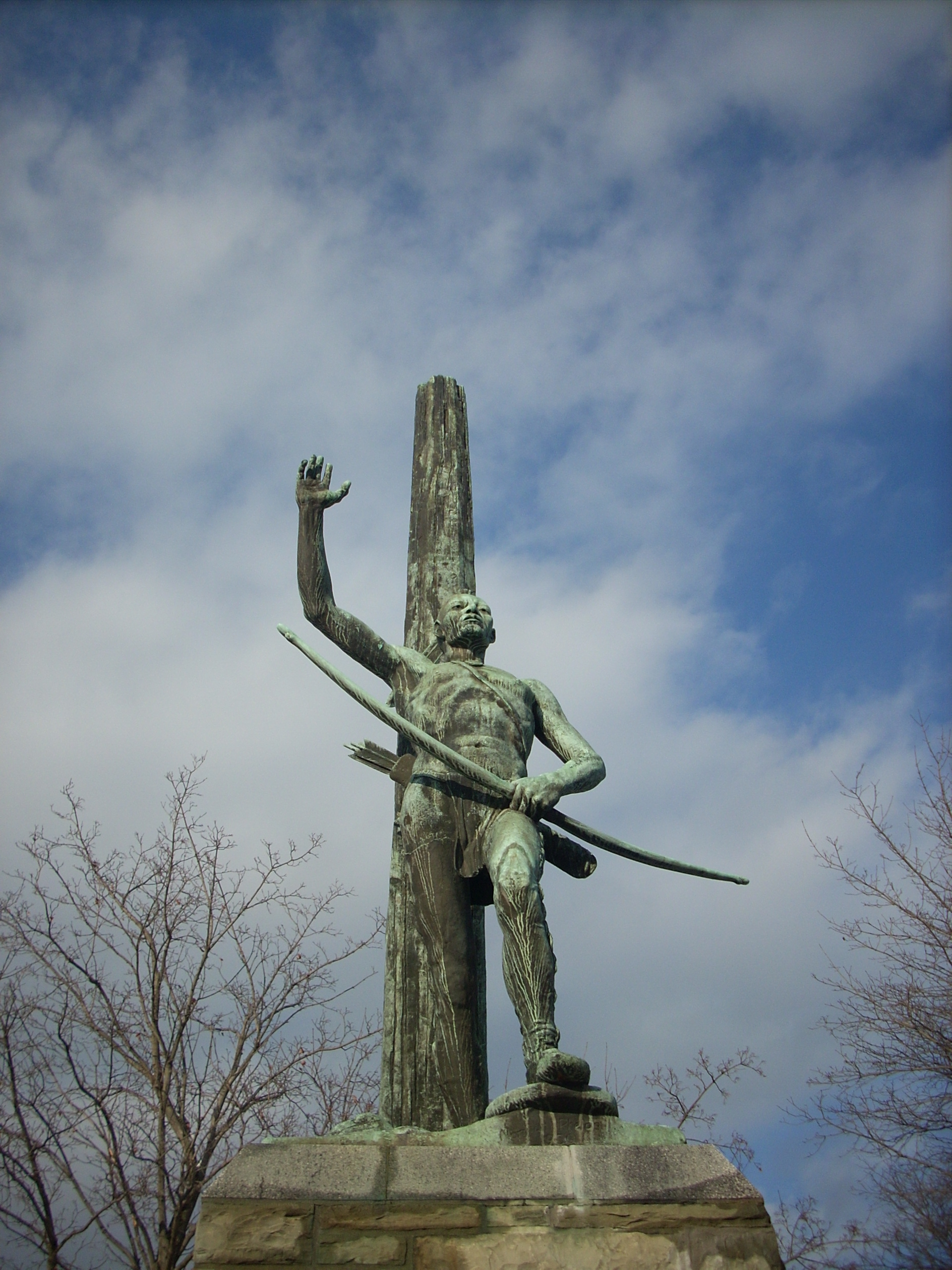
Monument traditionally thought to mark the burial place of Roland Montour, Painted Post, New York

Roland Montour (–1780?), also spelled Rowland, was the eldest son of Catherine Montour. He was married to a daughter of the Seneca chief Sayenqueraghta, known as "Old King" or "Old Smoke," and Cayuga wife. Both were members of nations in the Haudenosaunee Confederacy.

He was active in the American Revolution on the British side. He participated in the raid that captured Benjamin Gilbert.

He is reputed to have died in September 1780, in Painted Post, New York of wounds received in the Sugarloaf Massacre at Little Nescopeck Creek, Pennsylvania. But, sources say he lived for several years after the massacre.

== "Stuttering John" Montour ==
John Montour (–c.1830; also known as "Stuttering John") was the son of Catherine Montour, the younger brother of Roland. He died about 1830 at Big Tree, New York.

== John Montour ==
John Montour (1744–1788) was the son of Andrew Montour. He fought on the British side in the American Revolution until 1778, when he was imprisoned in Detroit by Henry Hamilton for helping some prisoners escape. After this he switched sides and supported the rebel Colonists.

His mother was a Delaware, the granddaughter of Sassoonam and his wife.

== Nicholas Montour ==
Nicholas Montour (1756–1808) was the son of Andrew Montour and Sally Ainse. He was a fur trader, seigneur, and political figure in Lower Canada.

== Simplified family tree ==
Many details are unclear and contradictory. This chart shows two possible identifications for Madam Montour (green boxes), and two possible lines of descent for French Margaret and Andrew Montour.

Family of Madam Montour (simplified)

Pierre Couc dit Lafleur (1627–1690)	Marie Miteoamegoukoué (1631–1699)
Madeleine	Louis Montour (c. 1659–1709)	Isabelle Couc (b. 1667)	Marguerite Couc (b. 1664)	Jean Baptiste Couc (b. 1673)
Daughter (b. c. 1685)
Andrew Montour	"French Margaret"	"Queen Esther"	Michael Montour
John Montour	Nicholas Montour	"Queen Catharine"

== Place names ==
The following places are named for members of the Montour family:

- Catharine, New York
- Catharine Creek
- Montour County, Pennsylvania
  - Montour Ridge, Montour County
- Montour Township, in Columbia County, Pennsylvania
- Montour, New York
- Montour Falls, New York
- Montour Run, a creek in Columbia County, Pennsylvania
- Montour's Island, in Allegheny County, Pennsylvania
- Montoursville, Pennsylvania
- Queen Catharine's Marsh, New York
- Queen Esther's Rock, village of Wyoming, Pennsylvania. Montour High School Robinson Township, PA

== See also ==
- History of Lycoming County, Pennsylvania
