= Rupert Covered Bridge No. 56 =

- U.S. National Register of Historic Places
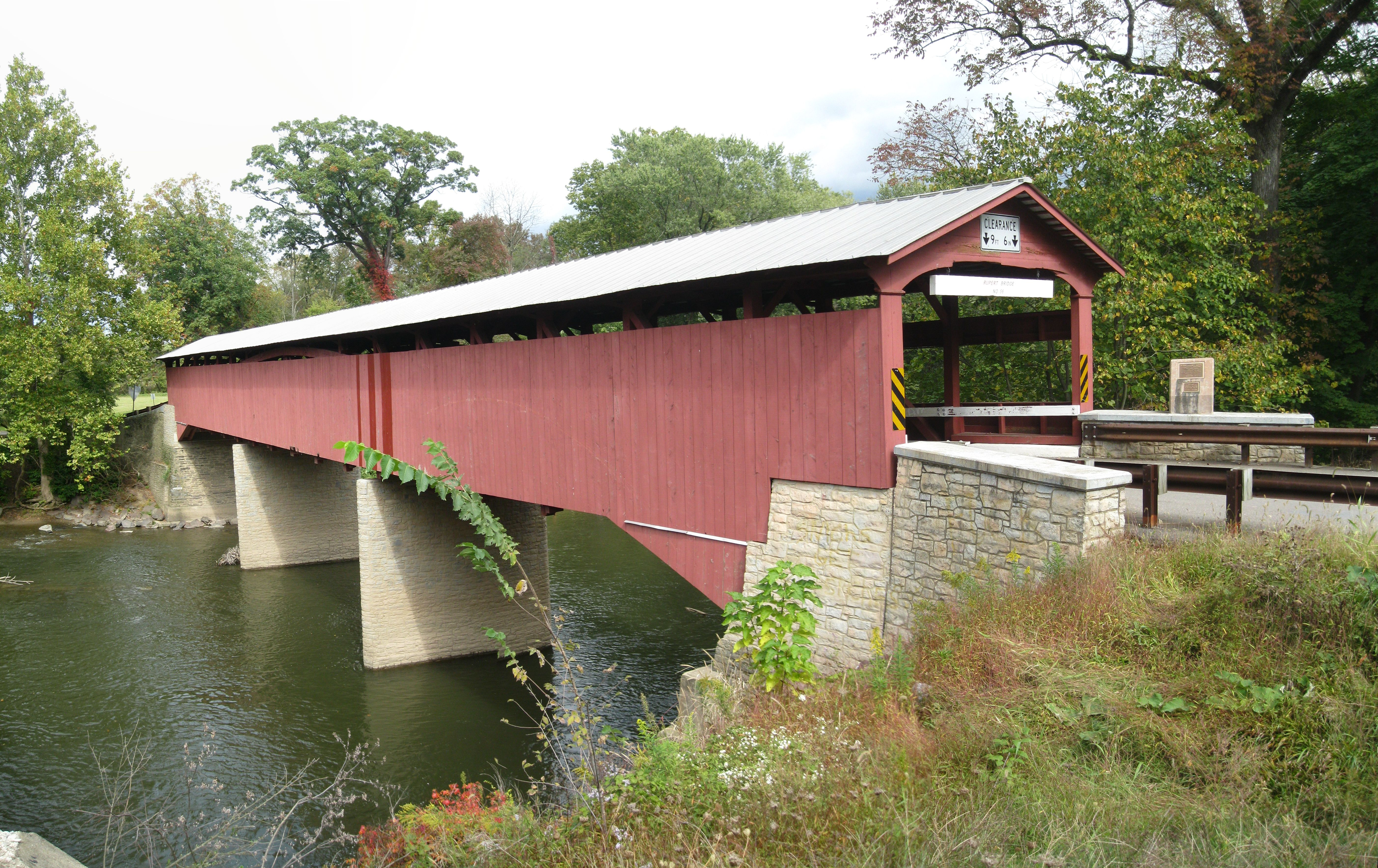
- The bridge in September 2012

- Location within Pennsylvania Location within the United States
- Location: Rupert, Pennsylvania and Bloomsburg
- Coordinates: 40°58′53″N 76°28′23″W
- Area: 0.2 acres (0.081 ha)
- Built: 1847
- Built by: Jesse W. Beard
- Architectural style: Burr Truss-Arch
- MPS: Covered Bridges of Columbia and Montour Counties TR
- NRHP reference No.: 79003186
- Added to NRHP: November 29, 1979

The Rupert Covered Bridge No. 56 (also known as the Rupert Bridge) is a covered bridge in Columbia County, Pennsylvania, in the United States. It is one of 23 covered bridges in Columbia County. The bridge is on the National Register of Historic Places and is the oldest existing covered bridge in Columbia County. The bridge is located in the community of Rupert and is open to traffic.

== Location and traffic ==
The Rupert Covered Bridge Number 56 crosses Fishing Creek in Montour Township, in the community of Rupert. It is on TR409, near US Route 11, Pennsylvania Route 42, and the Bloomsburg Fairgrounds. The bridge is in the United States Geological Survey quadrangle of Catawissa.

The Rupert Covered Bridge Number 56 is a 3-span and has a wider deck than any of the other covered bridge in Columbia County, Pennsylvania, but is still restricted to only one lane of traffic. It is open to traffic with no restrictions. An average of 375 vehicles use the bridge daily and six percent of the traffic is truck traffic, on average while the other 94 percent of traffic is car or SUV traffic. However, the bridge is functionally obsolete.

== Description ==
The Rupert Covered Bridge Number 56 is a burr arch bridge with a triple span 164 feet (50 m) long and the entire length is approximately 185 feet (56 m). The road inside the bridge is 17.25 feet (5.26 m) wide, with a clearance of 9.8 feet (3.0 m). The single lane main span is of the bridge is made of steel and has a stringer, multi-beam, or girder. The deck and wearing surface of the bridge are both made of wood. As of April 2011, the superstructure of the bridge is in "excellent" condition. The deck is in "very good" condition and the substructure is in "good" condition. At 185 feet long, this is the longest covered bridge in Columbia County.

== History and etymology ==
The Rupert Covered Bridge Number 56 was constructed in 1847, making it the oldest existing covered bridge in Columbia County. The bridge was built by Jesse M. Beard for a cost of $1,637. In the late nineteenth century, Reuben Hess purchased from Thomas Knorr a tract of land near the bridge. The tract historically contained a picnic area known as Rupert Grove, which was situated in a grove.

The Rupert Covered Bridge Number 56 was structurally deficient throughout the 1990s. However, it was renovated in 2001 and is still standing, as of 2013.

The bridge was added to the National Register of Historic Places on November 29, 1979. It is owned by the County Highway Agency and was named for the community of Rupert. Rupert is itself named after Leonard Rupert, who arrived at the vicinity in 1788.

== See also ==
- List of covered bridges in Columbia County, Pennsylvania
