= Madame Montour =

Algonquin interpreter and diplomat

- Born: 1667 or c. 1685; Canada, New France
- Died: c. 1753
- Occupations: Interpreter, diplomat, local leader
- Spouse(s): Carondawana, an Oneida chief, possibly others
- Children: "French Margaret", Andrew Montour, possibly others
- Relatives: grandchildren Nicholas Montour, John Montour, "Queen Catharine" Montour, "Queen Esther",

Madame Montour (1667 or c. 1685 – c. 1753) was an interpreter, diplomat, and local leader of Algonquin and French Canadian ancestry. Although she was well known, her contemporaries usually referred to her only as "Madame" or "Mrs." Montour. She may have been Isabelle (or Elizabeth) Couc, a mixed-race woman born in 1667, or perhaps Isabelle Couc's niece, who was born around 1685 and whose given name is uncertain.

In 1711, Montour began working as an interpreter and diplomatic consultant for the province of New York. Around 1727, she and her husband Carondawana, an Oneida, moved to the province of Pennsylvania. Her village, known as Otstonwakin, was at the mouth of Loyalsock Creek on the West Branch Susquehanna River. The modern borough of Montoursville, named for her, developed on the east bank after the American Revolutionary War.

Montour's son Andrew Montour also became an important interpreter in Pennsylvania and Virginia, as did his son John Montour. Some of Montour's female relatives were prominent local leaders in New York and Pennsylvania, and have often been confused with her by historians.

== Identity debate ==
There has been confusion about details of Madame Montour's life. She has often been confounded with her female relatives, particularly Catharine Montour, who was prominent in western New York. Historians have long attempted to separate fact from fiction and piece together her life from a few records and conflicting names.

Much is uncertain about her early life. In 1744, Witham Marshe met the "celebrated Mrs. Montour" at an important treaty conference held in Lancaster, Pennsylvania. When asked about her background, Montour told Marshe that she had been born in Canada to a French father. She said that she had been captured by the Iroquois about fifty years earlier (i.e. around 1694), when she was about ten years old, and that she did not remember much about her parents. She had been adopted and raised by the Iroquois, she said. She eventually married Carondawana, an Oneida war chief, with whom she had several children before his death in battle in 1729.

In 1974, historian William A. Hunter tentatively identified Madame Montour as Elizabeth Couc, a mixed born in 1667 near Trois-Rivières, New France, in what is now Quebec, Canada. Elizabeth (also known as Isabelle, which was used interchangeably in French at the time) Couc was one of five children recorded for Pierre Couc dit Lafleur (1627–1690), a French-born fur trader and interpreter, and Marie Miteoamegoukoué (1631–1699), a Christian Algonquin woman. Hunter conceded that some of the evidence connecting Madame Montour with Elizabeth Couc was "vague and contradictory". He accepted that Montour had been captured by an Iroquois war party around 1695, but if she was Elizabeth Couc, she was much older than ten at the time.

Hirsch and Sivertsen have explained the discrepancies by suggesting that Montour was deliberately vague about her past; this allowed her to present a different account of herself in Pennsylvania as a genteel French woman, albeit one in Indian dress. Elizabeth (or Élisabeth) Couc apparently also used the name of Isabelle, the French form of Elizabeth; the two names were then interchangeable. Historian Alison Duncan Hirsch uncovered a record from 1711 that lists payments to "Eysabelle Montour interpretress", the only known reference to Montour's first name in an English document. Isabelle Couc presumably had an Algonquin name too, but it is unknown.

Parmenter and Hagedorn are among contemporary historian who have argued that Madame Montour was not Isabelle Couc, but rather her niece. According to this interpretation, Montour was born in an Indian village near modern Sorel, Quebec, around 1685, a year consistent with the story that she told Marshe. Her parents were Louis Couc Montour, who was the brother of Isabelle Couc, and Madeleine, a Sokoki (Western Abenaki) woman. If Montour was born in 1685, her birth apparently went unrecorded, and her first name is uncertain. Her given name has also been represented as Catherine, Elisabeth/Isabelle, and Madeleine.

== Marriage and family ==
As pieced together by Hirsch, Madame Montour was Isabelle Couc and led an eventful life before beginning her career in New York as an interpreter for the British. In 1684, Couc married Joachim Germano, with whom she had at least one child. By the 1690s she was living in Michilimakinac (present-day Michigan) with two of her sisters and their husbands, who worked as interpreters in the fur trading center. Isabelle may also have worked as an interpreter for Sieur de Cadillac, the local French commander. Cadillac would later claim that Isabelle led a "dissolute life", and had more than one hundred male lovers; some historians attribute his vitriol to some personal bias. When Cadillac moved the French garrison to Fort Detroit in 1701, Isabelle evidently relocated there with her new husband, Pierre Tichenet. She became involved with Étienne de Veniard, Sieur de Bourgmont; when he deserted the fort in 1706, she fled with him. Her experience in the northwest territory gave her more exposure to a variety of Algonquian and Iroquois languages, increasing her facility in each.

Perhaps around 1708, Montour married an Oneida war captain named Carondawana. (If Madame Montour was instead the niece of Isabelle Couc, Carondawana was probably her only husband.) The couple had a son about 1720 named Andrew Montour, who would become a well-known interpreter in Pennsylvania and Virginia. Iroquois kinship terms often described a woman's niece as her daughter, for example, so there is confusion about the identities of Montour's other possible children. Another boy, Lewis (Louis) Montour, was possibly her son, or perhaps her nephew. "French Margaret" Montour, a woman often described as Montour's daughter, may have been a niece.

In the simplified family tree chart shown below, the names in green are the two women who have been identified as Madame Montour. Andrew Montour is connected on the chart to both of his potential mothers. Similarly, because it is uncertain if French Margaret was Montour's daughter or niece, the chart illustrates both possibilities.

Family of Madame Montour

Pierre Couc dit Lafleur (1627–1690)	Marie Miteoamegoukoué (1631–1699)
Madeleine	Louis Montour (c. 1659–1709)	Isabelle Couc (b. 1667)	Marguerite Couc (b. 1664)	Jean Baptiste Couc (b. 1673)
Daughter (b. c. 1685)
Andrew Montour	"French Margaret"	"Queen Esther"	Michael Montour
John Montour	Nicholas Montour	"Queen Catharine"

== Career in New York ==
The first Montour to come to prominence was Louis Montour, who was either Madame Montour's brother or father. Born Louis Couc, he adopted "Montour" as his surname in the 1680s. During King William's War (1689–1697), Montour and other Indians in Canada fought against British-allied Iroquois from the province of New York. At this time an Iroquois raiding party may have captured his daughter, who, according to some interpretations, became known as "Madame Montour".

Louis Montour relocated to Michilimakinac in the 1690s, where he worked as a fur trader. After King William's War ended, he began to facilitate trade between western Algonquians and merchants in Albany, New York. He accompanied the "Far Indians" to Albany. This lucrative enterprise diverted profits from New France to New York, and promoted diplomatic ties between the Iroquois and the western nations. Officials in New France saw this as a threat. In 1709, during Queen Anne's War, Louis-Thomas Chabert de Joncaire and his men assassinated Louis Montour on orders from Governor Vaudreuil.

After Louis Montour's murder, Madame Montour emerged as his successor, identified as Mountour's sister and benefiting from some of the trust accorded to him. Although she evidently could not read or write, she was valuable as an interpreter, able to speak French, English, and several languages in both the Algonquian and Iroquoian families. With family connections throughout the region, she was also an ideal cultural intermediary. According to historian Jon Parmenter, Madame Montour's role as a "behind the scenes" consultant was even more important than her work as an interpreter. When Robert Hunter became governor of New York in 1710, Montour became his personal interpreter and one of his most trusted advisers. They communicated in French. Her husband Carondawana took the English name "Robert Hunter" to honor the governor. He became "king" of the Algonquian-speaking Shawnee in Pennsylvania in 1714, and traveled between there and New York with Madame Montour for years, strengthening connections between them and the Iroquois.

Although Madame Montour served as an interpreter through the 1710s, there are few records of her activities at this time. In 1719, she petitioned New York for back pay, although with Governor Hunter's departure in 1720, she may not have received it. According to historian Alison Duncan Hirsch, the wording of an official recommendation about Montour's salary "has been misread to mean that she was asking to be paid the same as a man"; rather, she wanted the pay of an interpreter, which was higher than that of a common soldier.

== Life in Pennsylvania ==
Otstuagy - Madame Montour's Pennsylvania Village
- Location within Pennsylvania
- Location: Montoursville, Pennsylvania, U.S.
- Nearest city: Williamsport, Pennsylvania
- Coordinates: 41.234998°N 76.942721°W

At some point, Montour and her family migrated to the province of Pennsylvania. Exactly when and why she moved is unclear. She may have been traveling between New York and Pennsylvania as early as 1714, when her husband Carondawana was appointed as the Iroquois spokesman for the Shawnee living in Pennsylvania. By 1727, she and Carondawana were living at Otstonwakin, a village also known as Otstuagy or French Town. The site of previous Native American villages, Otstonwakin was located along the Great Shamokin Path, at the important confluence of Loyalsock Creek with the West Branch Susquehanna River, on the west bank of the river. The modern borough of Montoursville developed on the east bank after the American Revolutionary War.

Because of her cultural knowledge of Native American affairs and facility with both the Iroquoian and Algonquian language families, Montour was sought as an adviser by Pennsylvania officials and private traders. She first appears in the Pennsylvania historical record in July 1727 as an interpreter at a council in Philadelphia between Governor Patrick Gordon and an Iroquois group.

Madame Montour and Carondawana had a close relationship with Shikellamy, a noted Oneida diplomat who benefited from the couple's cultural and linguistic expertise. In 1729, Carondawana was killed fighting against the southern Catawba, traditional foes of the Iroquois. After her husband's death, Montour was gradually excluded from Pennsylvania diplomacy by Shikellamy and his colonial associate Conrad Weiser, who wanted to keep tight control of the province's relationship with the Iroquois. After 1734, she no longer appeared at councils in an official capacity. She retired to her village, where she operated a trading post and supply depot, and raised her son Andrew Montour to be an interpreter and diplomat.

During the 1740s, Montour met several Moravian missionaries who were evangelizing in Pennsylvania. Count Nicolaus Ludwig Zinzendorf, bishop of the Moravian Church, visited Otstonwakin in 1742 on his journey to Onondaga, the Iroquois capital in western New York. He delivered a sermon in French, during which Montour reportedly wept. Montour asked Zinzendorf to baptize two Indian children, but he declined, explaining that the Moravians did not perform baptisms in a village without first establishing a mission there. "She left me displeased", wrote Zinzendorf.

In 1744, Montour attended the conference for the treaty of Lancaster, where she told her story to Witham Marshe, as described above. Marshe, like others, thought that Montour was a French woman captured by and raised among the Indians, rather than a métis of partial French ancestry. Historian Alison Duncan Hirsch has argued that the captivity story Montour told to Marshe was a fiction she created to reinvent herself in Pennsylvania, claiming her father had been a governor of New France.

By 1745, she had left Otstonwakin and was living with her son Andrew on an island in the Susquehanna River near the Native village of Shamokin, which was settled by Delaware, Oneida and Siouan-speaking Tutelo. In March 1746, Andrew took her west, across the Appalachian Mountains to Logstown on the Ohio River. She was reportedly going blind by that time. This was her last appearance in the historical record, aside from a brief statement made by trader John Harris in January 1753: "Madame Montour is dead." Exactly when and where she died is unknown.

== Legacy ==
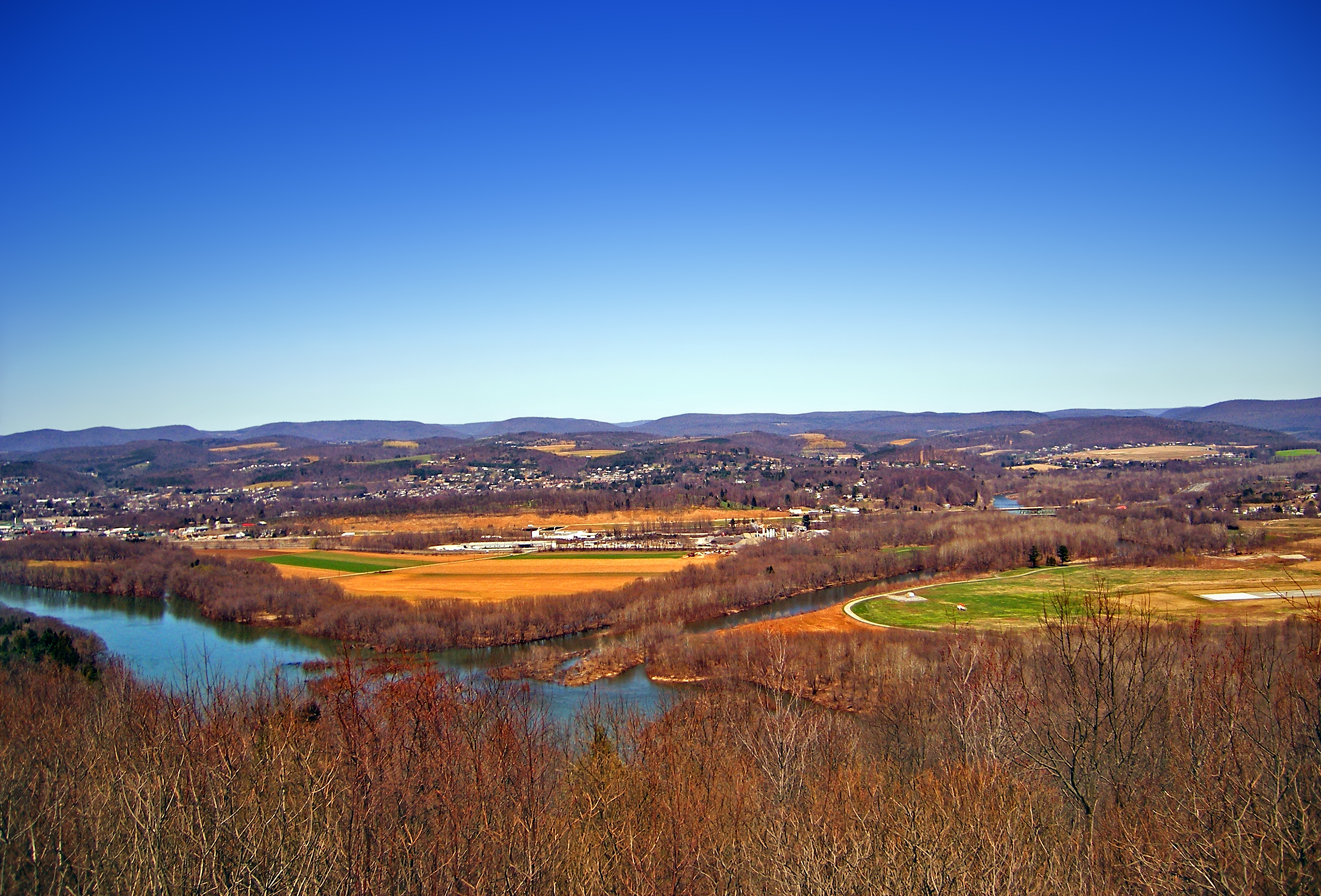
Madame Mountour's village of Otstonwakin was located at the mouth of Loyalsock Creek on the West Branch Susquehanna River

Madame Montour has numerous descendants, and many Iroquois people still carry the Montour name. Montoursville, Pennsylvania, which was founded near the site of Otstonwakin, was named for her. Montour County, Pennsylvania, and Montour Falls, New York, are just two of the places named for her descendants and relatives.

Montour's role as interpreter and cultural go-between was continued by her son, Andrew Montour, who shared his mother's gift for languages. He worked as an interpreter for Pennsylvania, Virginia, and Sir William Johnson's Indian Department. Andrew Montour was appointed as a captain in George Washington's regiment at Fort Necessity during the French and Indian War. He was granted 880 acres (3.6 km^{2}) of land by Pennsylvania in the Montoursville area. He left Montoursville at some point and moved to what now is Juniata County before finally settling on Montour's Island in the Ohio River near Pittsburgh.

She may have had another son, Lewis (or Louis) Montour, whose Indian name was apparently Tau-weson or Tan Weson. He may have been her nephew rather than her son. Little is known about him. He served as a messenger, and was reportedly killed in the French and Indian War.

Montour's daughter or niece, Margaret, sometimes known as "French Margaret", became the leader of French Margaret's Town, an Indian settlement at the mouth of Lycoming Creek a few miles up the West Branch Susquehanna River from Montour's village. Margaret Montour's daughter Catharine Montour also became a noted local leader, and many 19th-century historians confused her with Madame Montour.

AT least four streams in Pennsylvania were named after her; see Montour Run.

== See also ==
- Montour family

== Bibliography ==
- Hagedorn, Nancy L."'Faithful, Knowing, and Prudent': Andrew Montour As Interpreter and Cultural Broker, 1740–1772". In Margaret Connell Szasz, ed., Between Indian and White Worlds: The Cultural Broker, 44–60. University of Oklahoma Press, 1994.
- Hirsch, Alison Duncan. "'The Celebrated Madame Montour': Interpretess across Early American Frontiers", Explorations in Early American Culture 4 (2000): 81–112 (subscription required)
- Merrell, James. "'The Cast of His Countenance': Reading Andrew Montour." In Ronald Hoffman, et al., eds., Through a Glass Darkly: Reflections on Personal Identity in Early America, 13–39. Chapel Hill: University of North Carolina Press, 1997.
- Parmenter, Jon. "Isabel Montour: Cultural Broker on the Eighteenth-Century Frontiers of New York and Pennsylvania." In Ian K. Steele and Nancy Rhoden, eds., The Human Tradition in Colonial America, 141–59. Wilmington, Delaware: Scholarly Resources Press, 1999.
- Sivertsen, Barbara J. Turtles, Wolves, and Bears: A Mohawk Family History. Westminster, Maryland: Heritage Books, 1996. ISBN 978-0-7884-0484-9.
- Wallace, Paul A. W. "Madame Montour". In Edward T. James, ed., Notable American Woman, 1607–1950: A Biographical Dictionary, 2:568–69. Cambridge, Massachusetts: Belknap Press, 1971.
