= Montour Run =

Coordinates: 40°59′07″N 76°28′30″W

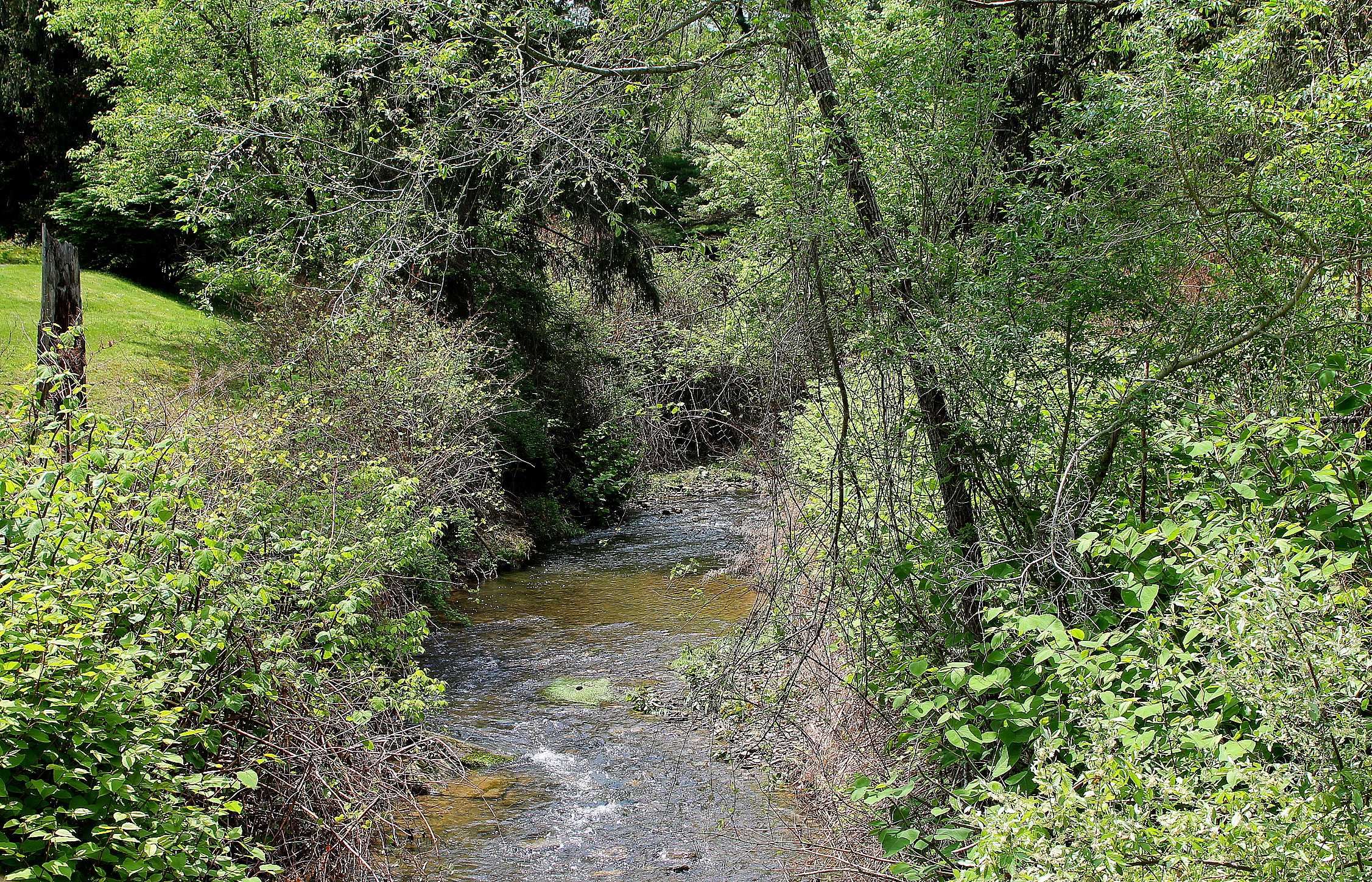
- Montour Run looking upstream near its mouth in Rupert

Physical characteristics
- Source
  - location: western Montour Township, Pennsylvania
- Mouth
  - location: Fishing Creek in eastern Montour Township, Pennsylvania
- Length: 3.1 mi (5.0 km)
- Basin size: 4.7 mi^{2} (12 km^{2})

Basin features
- Progression: Fishing Creek; Susquehanna River; Chesapeake Bay

Montour Run is a tributary of Fishing Creek in Columbia County, Pennsylvania. It is the last named tributary to join the creek and is 3.1 miles (5.0 km) long. The stream's watershed has an area of approximately 4.7 square miles and is located in Montour Township, Columbia County and Cooper Township, Montour County. The annual load of sediment in the watershed is 4,248,000 pounds (1,927,000 kg), most of which comes from agricultural lands. Minnows live in the stream.

A. Joseph Armstrong called the stream "undistinguished" and "not an impressive stream" in his book Trout Unlimited's Guide to Pennsylvania Limestone Streams.

== Course ==
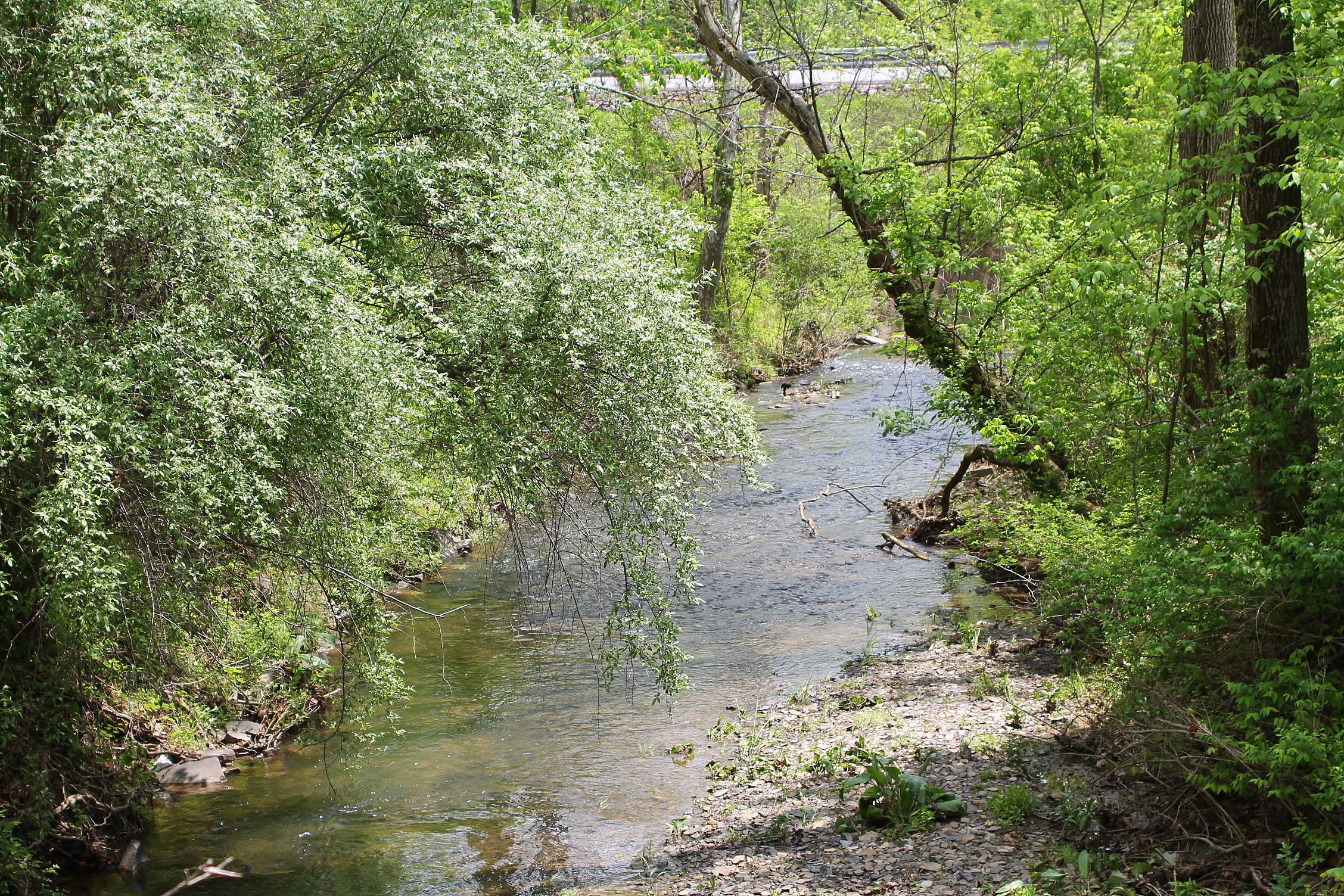
Montour Run looking downstream near its mouth (close to the village of Rupert)

Montour Run begins in the western reaches of Montour Township, near the western edge of Columbia County. The headwaters are slightly south of U.S. Route 11 and near the community of Grovania. The stream flows east for a short distance and passes a landing strip, roughly following U.S. Route 11, before turning east-southeast and receiving an unnamed tributary from a quarry. Shortly after receiving the tributary, it turns east-northeast and then east. After a short distance, it turns northeast, continuing to follow U.S. Route 11. The stream passes through a pond and crosses under Pennsylvania Route 42 before turning east-southeast and reaching its confluence with Fishing Creek near Rupert.

== Hydrology ==
The daily sediment load in Montour Run is 11,638 pounds (5,279 kg). This equates to 4,248,000 pounds (1,927,000 kg) per year. A 28.2% reduction in the load would be required for the stream to meet the Pennsylvania Department of Environmental Protection's standards.

Of the 4,248,000 pounds (1,927,000 kg) of sediment that flows through Montour Run per year, 3,550,800 pounds (1,610,600 kg) per year comes from croplands. 271,400 pounds (123,100 kg) comes from hay and pastures, 224,800 pounds (102,000 kg) comes from stream banks, and 109,400 pounds (49,600 kg) comes from land classified as "transition" by the Pennsylvania Department of Environmental Protection. Annually, 46,600 pounds (21,100 kg) of sediment in the stream comes from land classified as "low-intensity development" by the Pennsylvania Department of Environmental Protection and 45,000 pounds (20,000 kg) per year comes from forests. No sediment in the watershed comes from wetlands.

Most of the streams in the watershed of Montour Run do not meet the Pennsylvania Department of Environmental Protection's water quality standards, but a tributary in the northwestern reaches of the watershed do meet the standards.

The average annual rainfall in the Montour Run watershed between 1976 and 1992 was 39.4 inches (100 cm). The average annual runoff during this time period was 3.1 inches (7.9 cm). The stream has a high water temperature.

== Geography and geology ==
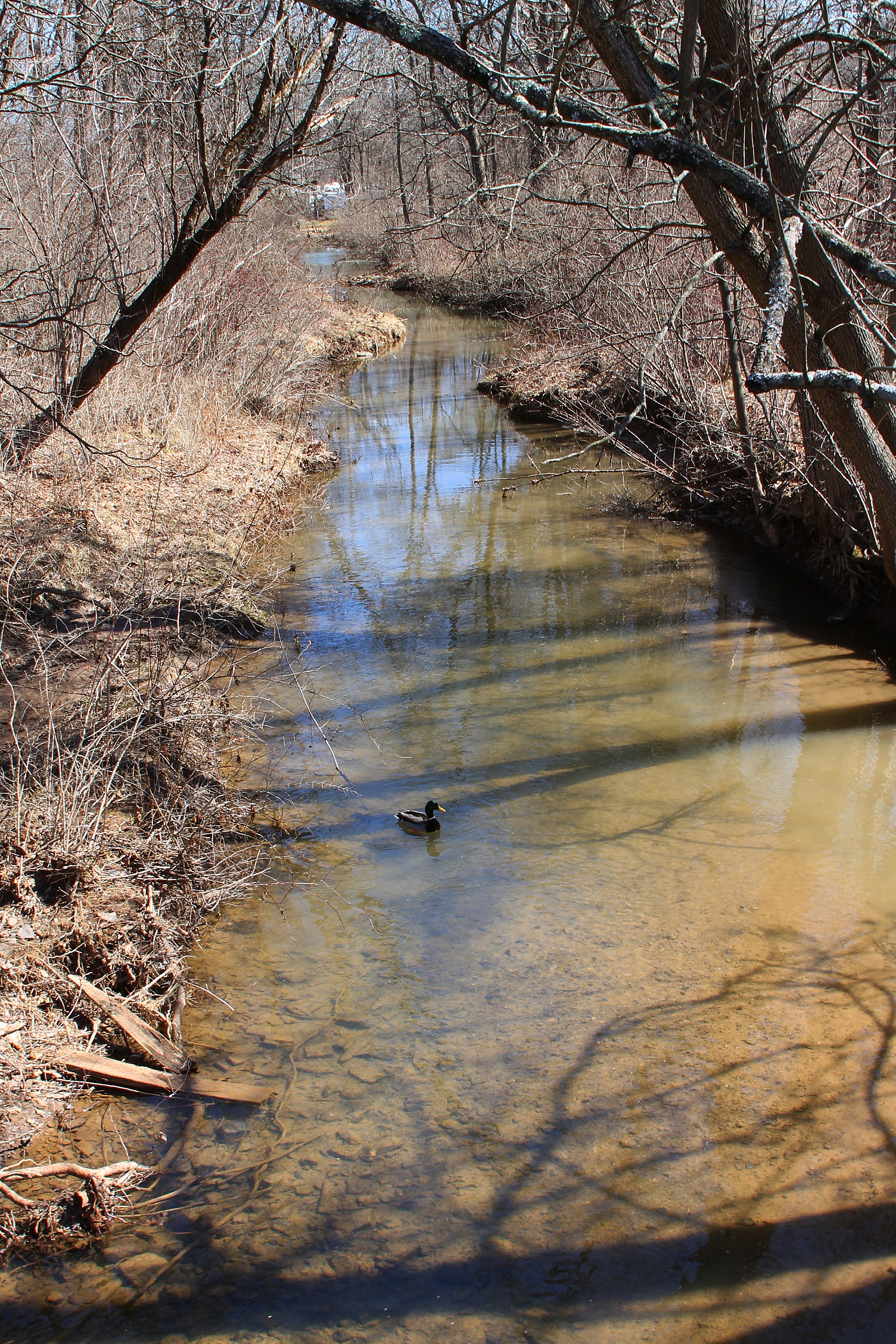
Montour Run looking downstream in its middle reaches, from Duessen Road

The watershed of Montour Run is located in the ridge and valley physiographic region of the Appalachian Mountains. The elevation in the watershed ranges from less than 500 feet (150 m) to more than 1,220 feet (370 m) above sea level.

50 percent of the rock in the watershed of Montour Run is shale 25 percent is sandstone, 20 percent is interbedded sedimentary rock. The remaining 5 percent is carbonate rock. The Mahantango Formation is found in the lower reaches of the Montour Run watershed, as is the Marcellus Formation. Both of these formations are from the Middle Devonian.

95 percent of the soil in the Montour Run watershed is in the hydrologic soil group B, while 5 percent is in the hydrologic soil group C.

Montour Run is 10 feet (3.0 m) wide. The banks of the stream experience erosion.

== Watershed ==
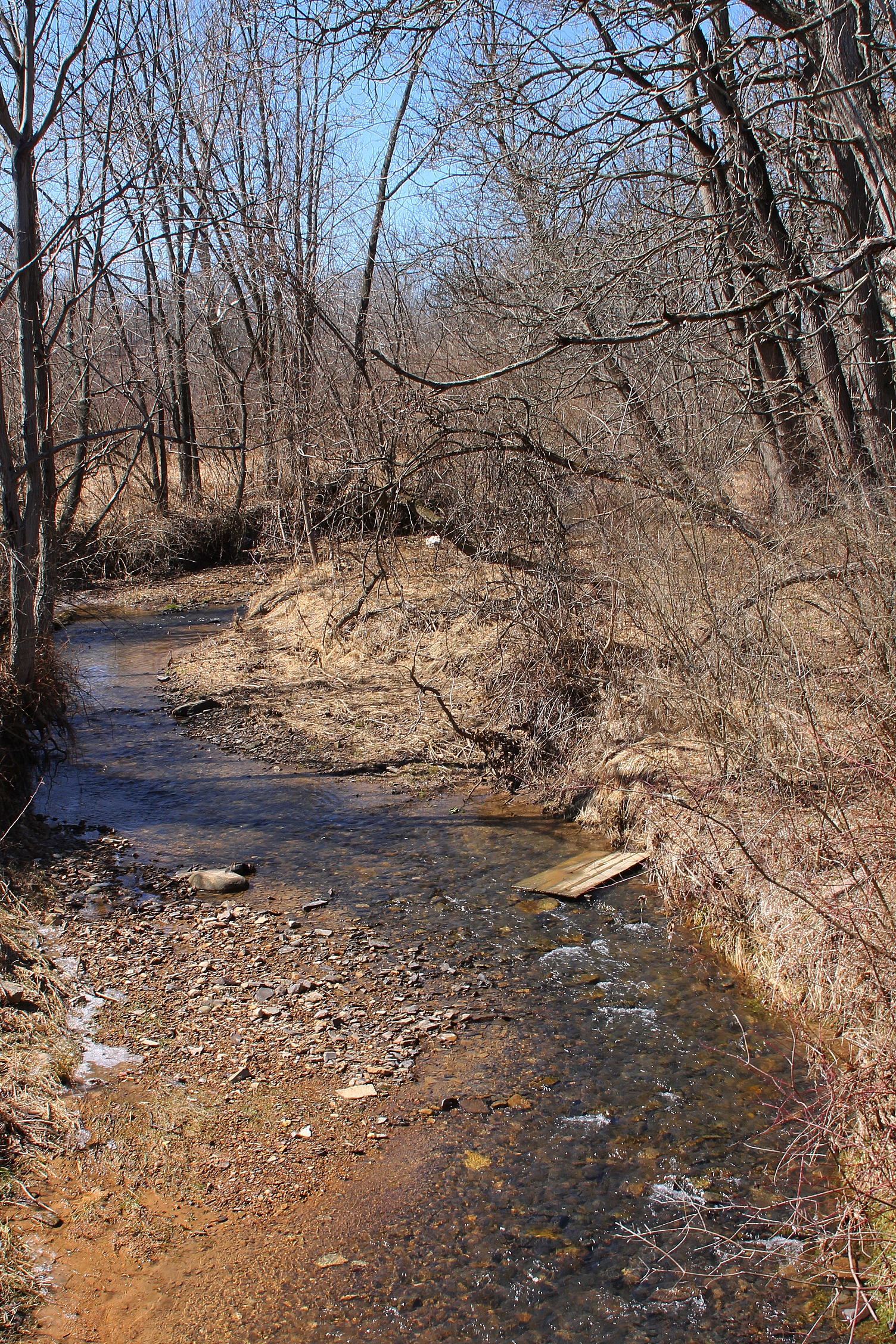
Montour Run looking upstream in its middle reaches, from Duessen Road

The watershed of Montour Run has an area of approximately 4.7 square miles. The watershed is in Montour Township, as well as Cooper Township, in Montour County. Agricultural land, including cropland, hay, and pastures, makes up 45.7% of the land in the watershed and forests make up 40.5% of the land. 13.1% of the land is classified as "low-intensity development" by the Pennsylvania Department of Environmental Protection and 0.7% of the watershed is wetland.

Hay and pastures occupy 800.6 acres of the watershed of Montour Run and 538.7 acres of the watershed are occupied by cropland.

There are NWI wetlands and steep slopes on the lower reaches of Montour Run.

There are 10.8 miles (17.4 km) of streams in the Montour Run watershed.

== History ==
Montour Run is named after Madame Montour.

A stone arch bridge was built over the stream near Bloomsburg in 1880 and it underwent repair in 1927. It is 29.9 feet (9.1 m) long and as of 2009, 150 vehicles per day travel over it.

== Biology ==
Montour Run is considered by the Pennsylvania Department of Environmental Protection to be a coldwater fishery. The only fish living in the stream are minnows.

The riparian buffer is limited in some places along Montour Run. Conservation farming is not practiced in the upper reaches of the watershed.

== See also ==
- Hemlock Creek
- List of rivers of Pennsylvania
