= Grovania =

Grovania may refer to:

- Grovania, Georgia, an unincorporated community
- Grovania, Pennsylvania, an unincorporated community
