= Lee School (Montour, New York) =

- U.S. National Register of Historic Places
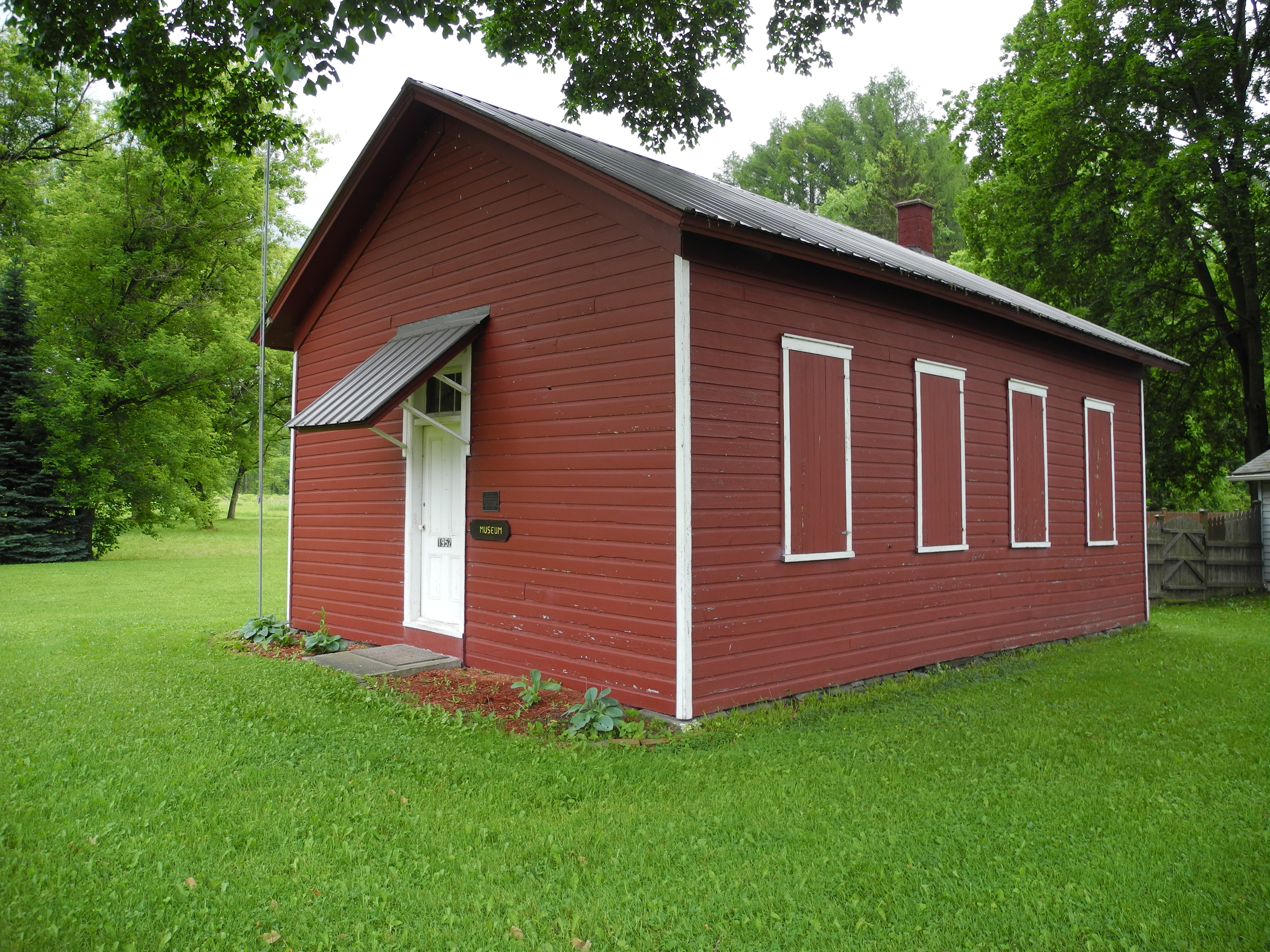

- Location within New York Location within the United States
- Location: NY 14, Montour, New York
- Coordinates: 42°19′40″N 76°50′28″W
- Area: 0.4 acres (0.16 ha)
- Built: 1884
- Architectural style: Late 19th Century Vernacular
- NRHP reference No.: 98000572
- Added to NRHP: May 20, 1998

Lee School is a historic one-room school building located at Montour in Schuyler County, New York, United States. It is a one-room, one story, gable roofed frame building built in 1884. It served the town as Montour District #1 School until 1937.

It was listed on the National Register of Historic Places in 1998.
