= The Captivity of Benjamin Gilbert =

Captivity narrative by William Walton

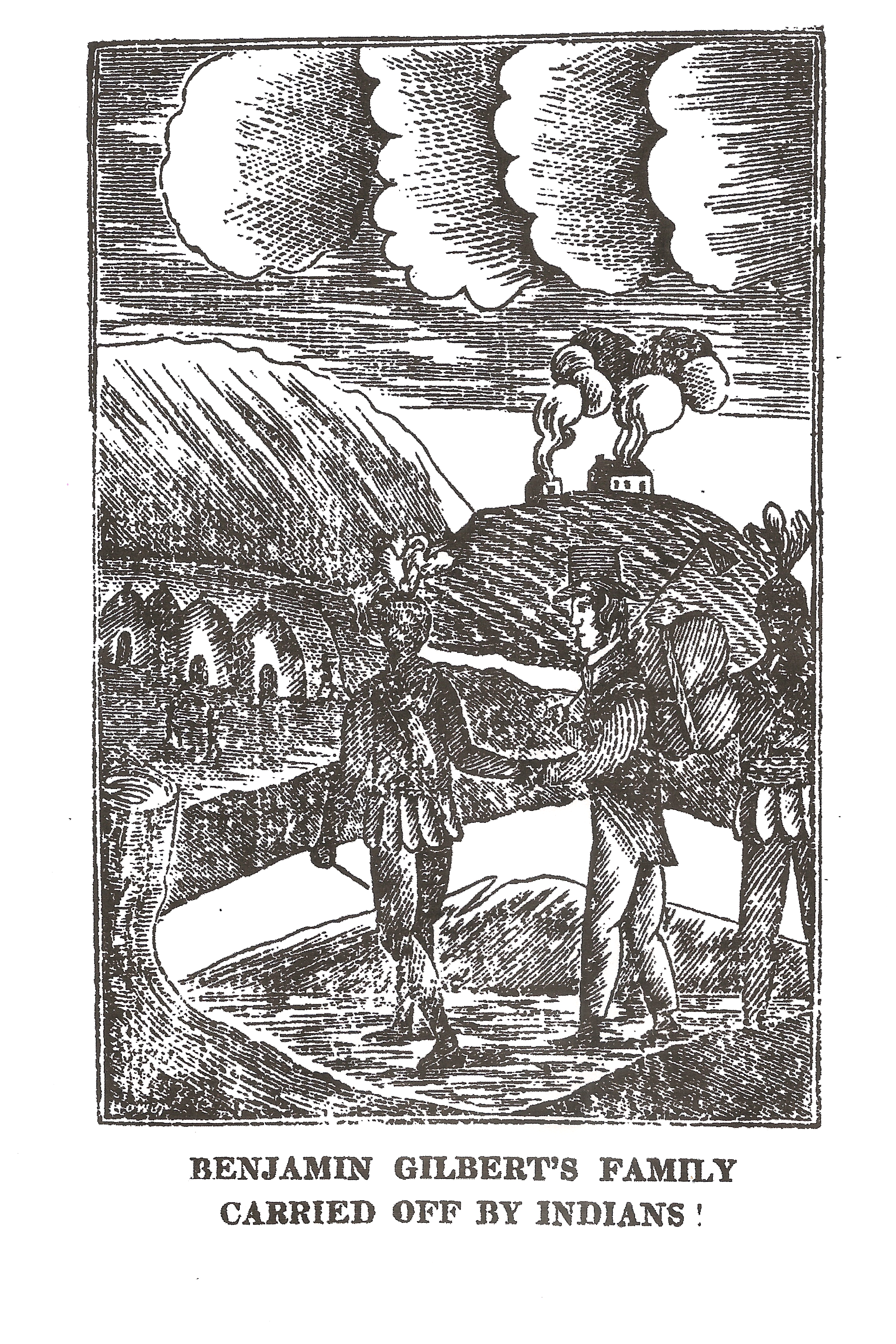
Frontispiece from Narrative of the Captivity and Sufferings of Benjamin Gilbert and Family (1813)

The Captivity of Benjamin Gilbert and His Family, 1780–83 is a captivity narrative by William Walton relating the experiences of a Quaker family of settlers near Mauch Chunk in present-day Jim Thorpe, Pennsylvania. The story was originally published in 1784, and has since been republished numerous times under varying titles.

== The narrative ==
In 1780, the Gilbert family was settled near what was then the frontier between encroaching colonists and Native Americans. In a minor action in the American Revolution a war party from the British base at Fort Niagara, under the overall command of Colonel John Butler, swept through the area. The attack was probably in retaliation for the destruction of native towns by the Sullivan Expedition the previous year.

The war party consisted of eleven people:

- Rowland Monteur - Mohawk, first captain.
- John Monteur - Mohawk, second in command, who was also styled captain.

Roland and John were the sons of Catherine Montour, called French Catherine.

- Samuel Harris, John Huston, and his son John Huston, jr.,— Cayugas.
- John Fox - Delaware

The other five were unidentified Senecas.

The war party took the Gilbert family and some neighbors captive, fifteen people in all:

- Benjamin Gilbert, aged 69.
- Elizabeth, Benjamin's wife, 55.
- Joseph Gilbert, Benjamin's son, 41.
- Jesse Gilbert, Benjamin's son, 19.
- Sarah Gilbert, Jesse's wife, 19.
- Rebecca Gilbert, Benjamin's daughter, 16.
- Abner Gilbert, Benjamin's son, 14.
- Elizabeth Gilbert, Benjamin's daughter, 12.
- Thomas Peart, Elizabeth Gilbert's son by a prior marriage, 23.
- Benjamin Gilbert, a son of John Gilbert of Philadelphia, 11.
- Andrew Harrigar, a hired worker, 26.
- Abigail Dodson, a neighbor, 14
- Benjamin Peart, Elizabeth Gilbert's son by a prior marriage, 27.
- Elizabeth Peart, Benjamin Peart's wife, 20.
- Elizabeth Peart, Benjamin Peart's daughter, about nine months old.

The group made the trek from Pennsylvania to Fort Niagara on foot and horseback, a journey of about a month. Although threatened with death several times the captives were generally well treated. Harrigar managed to escape en route.

On reaching Niagara, Benjamin and Elizabeth Gilbert, and Jesse and Sarah Gilbert were released through the intervention of John Butler and Guy Johnson, and sent by boat to Montreal. Benjamin died on the way, but the other three safely reached their destination.

The remaining captives were adopted by Indian families and spent time in Niagara and Buffalo Creek. The last were freed in 1782.
