= The Spirit of '76 (1917 film) =

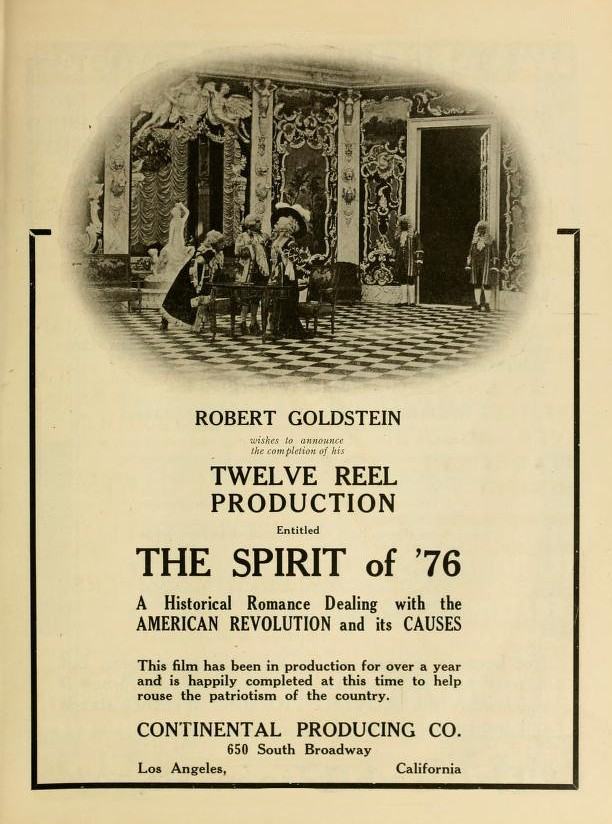
- Advertisement for movie
- Directed by: Frank Montgomery
- Written by: Robert Goldstein; George L. Hutchin
- Produced by: Robert Goldstein
- Starring: Adda Gleason; Howard Gaye; Chief Dark Cloud
- Cinematography: J. C. Cook
- Production company: Continental Producing Company
- Distributed by: State Rights
- Release date: May 1917 (Chicago)
- Running time: 9-12 reels
- Country: United States
- Language: Silent

The Spirit of '76 is a 1917 American silent film about the American Revolutionary War directed by Frank Montgomery and starring Adda Gleason and Howard Gaye. Produced by German-American film producer Robert Goldstein, the film would prove to be controversial upon release for its depiction of the British, and Goldstein was subsequently sent to a federal prison for violating the Espionage Act. No prints of the movie have been known to survive, and it is categorized as a lost film.

== Synopsis ==
A romance between King George III of Great Britain and a Quaker girl, Catherine, who becomes his morganatic wife, forms the early part of the story. Catherine is really half native, being the daughter of a French adventurer and an indigenous woman, adopted and brought to England by a Quaker voyager. The hardships of the American colonists are shown and their rebellion against the English rule. In this rebellion, Catherine sees a chance to avenge herself upon the King, who has legally married a German princess. She goes to America and becomes a power over a tribe of indigenous people. One of her aides is her own brother, who had been adopted by a colonist. Brother and sister are unaware of the relationship until the close of the story. The gallant fight which the Americans under General Washington wage against the English troops and the indigenous people under Catherine's lead forms a thrilling phase of the story and the chief incidents with which every American is familiar are dramatically set forth. In addition, there are several minor plots and romances, some of which end happily, others tragically, when the war is over and the fight for freedom won.

== Cast ==
- Adda Gleason - Catherine Montour
- Howard Gaye - Lionel Esmond
- George Chesborough - Walter Butler
- Chief Dark Cloud - Joseph Brant
- Doris Pawn - Madeline Brant
- Jack Cosgrove - George III
- Norval McGregor - Lorimer Steuart
- Jane Novak - Cecil Steuart
- William Colby - Sir John Johnson
- Lottie Cruez - Peggy Johnson
- Chief John Big Tree - Gowah
- William Freeman - Lord Chatham
- W. E. Lawrence - Captain Boyd
- William Beery - George Washington
- Ben Lewis - Benjamin Franklin
- Jack McCready - Tim Murphy

== Production ==
The film was produced by Los Angeles-based costume supplier and movie producer Robert Goldstein, who was born in California to German-Jewish parents. Goldstein outfitted the cast of D. W. Griffith's 1915 silent epic The Birth of a Nation, and was reportedly inspired by Griffith's film to produce a movie about the American Revolution. Griffith initially encouraged Goldstein's idea and cooperated with him, but later distanced himself from that project in favor of pursuing his own treatment of the subject, the 1924 film America. The film's script contained several historical inaccuracies, including an assault on Benjamin Franklin by George III and a sexual relationship between George and Catherine Montour – possibly based on his supposed (and equally fictitious) relationship with Hannah Lightfoot.

== Release and controversy ==
The film premiered in Chicago in May 1917 – just one month after the United States entered World War I on the side of the Allies, which included the United Kingdom. Upon release, the film became involved in controversy for its depiction of the British, in particular a scene depicting the Cherry Valley massacre, which was in reality carried out by Native American warriors. In the scene, British regulars and Hessian auxiliaries attack Cherry Valley, New York, and are shown committing acts such as assaulting a woman and bayoneting a baby. Goldstein would subsequently defend his depiction of the event by noting that a Hessian soldier was the one depicted bayoneting a baby.

The head of Chicago's Police Censor Board, Metellus Lucullus Cicero Funkhouser, confiscated the film at the behest of the United States Department of Justice on grounds that it generated hostility toward Britain. Goldstein trimmed the offending scenes and received federal approval to continue the Chicago run; but the film premiered in Los Angeles a few months later with the deleted scenes restored. After an investigation, the federal government concluded that Goldstein's action constituted "aiding and abetting the German enemy", and seized the film once again. Goldstein was charged in federal court with violating the Espionage Act. At trial, the U.S. prosecutor argued that as the war effort demanded total Allied support, Goldstein's film was seditious on its face. Goldstein was convicted on charges of attempted incitement to riot and to cause insubordination, disloyalty, and mutiny by U.S. soldiers then in uniform as well as prospective recruits, and he was sentenced to 10 years in prison. Implications were made throughout the trial that Goldstein was a German spy, although no evidence was presented in support of that accusation.

The judgment was later upheld by an appellate court. Goldstein's attorneys were unable to argue for protection under the First Amendment because the Supreme Court had ruled in 1915 that movies lacked such protection (that ruling was overturned in 1952). His sentence was later commuted to three years by President Wilson.

== Legacy ==
After his release from jail, Goldstein tried and failed to re-establish himself as a filmmaker in the Netherlands, Switzerland, Italy, and England (which refused him a visa). Eventually he landed in Germany, where he was equally unsuccessful. His biographer, Anthony Slide, could locate no communications from him after 1935, and thought it likely that he perished in a Nazi concentration camp. After Slide's book was published, a telegram sent from New York City in 1938 was discovered. In the telegram, Goldstein referred to "my enforced return [to the U.S.], three years ago..." suggesting that the Germans had deported him in 1935. Review of 1935 Immigration and Naturalization Service arriving passenger records show him arriving in New York City on August 16, 1935, ship name SS Albert Ballin with departure port of Hamburg, Germany.

His confirmed whereabouts after 1938 are unknown. However, we see through contemporary records that in March 1940 he filed for Social Security using his given name ROBERT GOLDSTEIN, birth date September 27, 1883, in San Francisco, CA, son of Simon Goldstein and Margret (sic) Moran. There is circumstantial US Federal Census evidence that may place him as an inmate in Rikers Island Penitentiary in 1940, and again as an inmate in Willard Asylum for the Chronic Insane in 1950. In both cases there is an inmate named Robert Goldstein born in California with a birth date within 2–3 years of 1883. Robert's younger brother, Louis Stanislaus Goldstein (September 9, 1894 – April 25, 1950), died in 1950. His obituary in the Los Angeles Times makes no mention of Robert.

In his 1995 book Lies My Teacher Told Me: Everything Your American History Textbook Got Wrong, Prof. James Loewen notes that Goldstein's prosecution was consistent with Wilson's targeting anyone suspecting of holding anti-British views, which the president claimed gave aid to Germany.

== See also ==
- List of lost films
- List of films about the American Revolution
- List of television series and miniseries about the American Revolution
