= Ghost of Queen Esther =

Haudenosaunee woman from Pennsylvania and folk story

Esther Montour, also known as Queen Esther, was a Haudenosaunee (Iroquois) leader in the British colony of Pennsylvania. Her village consisted of over five hundred citizens and was located between the modern-day towns of Sayre, Athens and Waverly.

== Battle of Queen Esther ==
The story goes that after learning of the death of her son during a violent argument between him and a drunken townsman, Queen Esther ordered the raid of a nearby farm as revenge for her loss. The exact number of victims killed in the raid has been debated but documents report of a man by the name of Arthur van Rossum and his wife Janna of Sayre were killed and scalped on September 27, 1778. A military force of two-hundred men under the command of Colonel Thomas Hartley was created and started up the Susquehanna River to Tioga Point, finally reaching the hilly area of Queen Esther. Hartley and his men were confronted by Haudenosaunee warriors resulting in a fierce battle. After several hours of heavy fighting, the Haudenosaunee warriors were overrun by Hartley and his men forcing them to retreat. News of her warriors' defeat quickly reached Queen Esther who attempted to flee with the women and children of her village into the surrounding forests in hopes of escaping to the Chemung River.

Historians have argued over the exact details of what occurred next, but the widely accepted claim is that Hartley and his men caught up with the fleeing villagers and forced them to march to a nearby pond. The women and children were lined up on the pond's bank and executed in mass numbers as Queen Esther was forced to watch the ordeal. The bodies of the victims were then dumped into the water to deny them of the proper burial practiced by the Haudenosaunee people. Queen Esther was then lynched by a nearby oak tree and dismembered before being thrown into the pond with the murdered villagers. Early documents have reported that the screams of the victims could be heard from the town of Athens which was over several miles away.

== Queen Esther's Curse ==
The journal of one of the men serving under Hartley gave light to the belief that the area where the massacre of Queen Esther happened is cursed. This is due to his writings of the lynching of the young queen and how her final words placed a curse on any white settlers who would set foot on the land. As early as the early 1800s, residents of the community known as Queen Esther have reported hearing unidentified screams from the surrounding forests. It is believed that these are the spirits of the massacred villagers.

Rumors have also reported of hunters seeing a young girl weeping as she hangs from the branches of an oak tree. When hunters run to investigate, she suddenly vanishes leaving no trace of her ever having been there. However hunters claim that after experiencing this ordeal, their weapons fail to fire if not checked before. Some believe this is Queen Esther attempting to prevent anymore villagers from being killed.

== See also ==
- List of ghosts
- Montour family
