= Catherine's Town =

Seneca town

Coordinates: 42°21′N 76°50′W

Catherine's Town (Seneca: Queanettquaga or Sheoquago) was a Seneca town named informally for a prominent Seneca woman, Catherine Montour. It was located at the south end of Seneca Lake, near present-day Watkins Glen (and the towns of Catharine and Montour, as well as the village of Montour Falls, all named for Catherine Montour) in what is now Schuyler County, New York.

The Seneca leader Red Jacket was said to have practiced his speeches at Shequaga Falls, located nearby in the present-day Town of Montour Falls. According to "Historical Sketch of the Chemung Valley, Etc..," he was also buried there.

Catherine's Town was destroyed by the Sullivan Expedition of 1779, one of more than 40 Haudenosaunee settlements decimated by the rebel colonial forces in retaliation for British-Haudenosaunee raids in the eastern Mohawk Valley. At the time the town was reported to have 30 houses, fields of corn, and fruit orchards, all of which were burned, in addition to the people's winter stores of corn.

Other names for the town during the colonial era were French Catherine Town, Catherine's Landing, Catherinestown, and Catharine Town, all after Montour. In the late 18th century, as new European-American settlers began to develop it, the village was known as Havana. It was later renamed as Montour Falls, New York. (There are both a village and the Town of Montour Falls.)
