= Andrew Montour =

Métis interpreter in early America (1710–1772)

- Sattelihu, Eghnisara

Mixed (Oneida and Algonkin/French) leader

Personal details
- Born: c. 1710 Otstonwakin near what became Montoursville, Pennsylvania
- Died: January 20, 1772
- Spouse: Sally Ainse
- Children: John Montour, born 1744; Nicholas Montour, born 1756
- Parent(s): Madame Montour, Carondawanna
- Known for: interpreter and negotiator, who spoke French, English, Delaware, Shawnee, and an Iroquois language
- Nickname(s): Henry, Andre

Andrew Montour (c. 1710 – 1772), also known as Sattelihu, Eghnisara, and Henry, (Note: Montour was also called Henry, possibly due to the similarity of sound with the French "Andre".) was an important interpreter and negotiator in the Virginia and Pennsylvania backcountry in the latter half of the 18th century. He was of Oneida and Algonquin ancestry, with a French grandfather. Historian James Merrell estimated his birth year as 1720. Likely born in his mother's village of Otstonwakin (near current Montoursville, Pennsylvania), he later led the village in the 18th century before settling further west.

Montour was commissioned as a captain in 1754 by Pennsylvania officials during the French and Indian War. He also commanded raiding parties in Ohio in 1764 during Pontiac's War (1763–1766) at the behest of Sir William Johnson, British superintendent of Indian Affairs. His son John Montour later became recognized as an interpreter and negotiator, serving with rebel forces during the American Revolutionary War.

== Early life and education ==
Montour was likely born in Otstawonkin, a native Lenape village located at the mouth of Loyalsock Creek on the West Branch Susquehanna River, about 1720. His mother was known as Madame Montour and was a well-known, influential interpreter, and his father was Carondawanna, otherwise known as Robert Hunter, an Oneida war chief based in New York. He was primarily of Native American ancestry, though his maternal grandfather was a French fur trader.

In 1729, when Andrew was young, his father was killed during a raid on the southern Catawba tribe.

Growing up in a polyglot world, he developed his mother's gift for languages, speaking French, English, Lenape (Delaware), Shawnee, and at least one of the Iroquois languages, likely Oneida.

== Biography ==
In 1742, Andrew Montour acted as guide and interpreter for Count Zinzendorf, among the Moravian missionaries who stopped at Otstonwakin. The latter described him by the following:

This man had a countenance like another European but around his whole face an Indianish broad ring of bear fat and paint, and had on a sky-colored coat of fine cloth, black cordovan neckband with silver bugles, a red damask lapelled waistcoat, breeches over which his shirt hung, shoes and stockings, a hat, and both ears braided with brass and other wire like a handle on a basket. He welcomed us cordially and when I spoke to him in French he replied in English. His name is Andre.

In May 1745, Montour accompanied Conrad Weiser and Shikellamy from Pennsylvania to Onondaga, the central meeting place of the Iroquois League in New York. In 1748, Weiser recommended Montour as a person especially qualified to act as an interpreter or messenger, and presented him to the Pennsylvania Council of the Proprietary Government.

Though Weiser spoke highly of Montour, the interpreter's drinking caused problems between them. Weiser wrote about this in a letter to the Provincial Secretary of Pennsylvania, Richard Peters. Weiser wrote: "I bought 2 quarts of Rum to use on our journey, but he drunk most all the first day. He abused me...when he was drunk..." (Note: cont. "...I reprimanded him when he is sober and he begged me not to mention it to you... However, he did the same again...")

Richard Peter described Montour at another time in a letter as "a dull stupid creature", "untractable", and a "fellow who kept low company of which he was more than likely to be the dupe." Peters wrote:

He has been arrested for fifty pounds and indeed, I would have suffered him to have gone to jail for he is a lavish man, having a wife who takes up goods at any rate and to any value. (Note: cont. "...he then goes to Onondago in a public character, and is even chosen a member of the Onondaga Council for the Ohio Indians. It may be dangerous to the public when he becomes imprisoned.)

Montour had problems with alcoholism and debt in much of his life. When sober, he was highly reliable and officials were willing to pay a high price to secure his skilled services. For example, Colonel George Washington wrote a letter to Virginia's governor Robert Dinwiddie, just before the former's capitulation at Fort Necessity during the French and Indian War, the North American front of the Seven Years' War between Great Britain and France. Washington requested the assistance of Montour, saying that he "...would be of use to me here at this moment in conversing with the Indians, for I don't have other persons to depend on." Washington said he was unsure how to treat the Indians.

In September 1755, Washington requested Montour's services again in Virginia, saying that he was: "...desirous of seeing [Montour] here; and the more so, because I have it in my power to do something for you in a settled way which I hope will be agreeable to you..." In addition, Washington asked for more aid for the Indians, promising that "...they shall be better used than they have been, and have all the kindness from us they can desire." Both the British and French colonists relied on their alliances with Native Americans for much of their fighting forces in this war.

Montour also served under Major General Edward Braddock, though the experience was a sour one. At a council held in Philadelphia during August 1755, one month after Braddock's defeat, Montour told the assembly for Scaroyady:

We Six Nations must let you know that it was the pride and ignorance of that great General that came from England. [that caused the defeat] He is now dead; but he was bad when he was alive: he looked upon us as dogs, and would never hear anything what was said to him. We often endeavored to advise him and to tell him of the danger he was in with his soldiers; but he never appeared pleased with us, and that was the reason that a great many of our warriors left him and would not be under his command.

=== Commissions ===
Montour received a captain's commission in 1754 during the French and Indian War. Later, under Sir William Johnson's Indian Department of the Northern District, Montour was given command of a raiding party in Ohio in 1764 during Pontiac's War (1763–1766). For his numerous efforts Montour was granted Pennsylvania lands by the colonial government: in Mifflin County, Montoursville, and Montour's Island near Pittsburgh. So strong was his influence with tribes in the Ohio River Valley that the French had put a bounty on his head to take him out of the action.

During Pontiac's War, Montour captained several raiding parties. On May 22, 1764, he and a group of Indians arrived at Niagara. While there, the Indians got drunk and threatened to kill him. Suffering hangovers the next morning, they all but forgot their mutinous actions of the night before; he forgave them for this behavior.

== Marriage and family ==
He first married Madelina, a Delaware woman, granddaughter of Sassoonan, a Lenape chief. They separated or she died.

Montour secondly married Sally Ainse, an Oneida (c. 1728–1823, also known as Sally Montour), when she was a teenager, as was their practice. Montour left her in around 1757 or 1758. He sent their children to school in Philadelphia and Williamsburg, Virginia, to learn English, to be educated for both cultures. Ainse kept a young son Nicholas with her while she was living in an Oneida settlement near the Mohawk River.

Their best-known child was a son, John Montour born in 1744, who followed in his father's footsteps. He became a well-known translator, negotiator, and go-between. John Montour served with American troops at Pittsburgh during the American Revolution.

== Death ==
Major Isaac Hamilton wrote from Fort Pitt on January 22, 1772, reporting that Montour: "...was killed at his own house the day before yesterday [January 20] by a Seneca Indian, who had been entertained by him at his house for some days. He was buried this day near the Fort."

For their tribute, "the Indians who came to the funeral beg'd a few gallons of Rum to drown their sorrows for the life of their friend." The cost of the drinks for the Indian's lamentations was pegged at a little better than £7 ($250 in 2022 USD).

== Legacy and honors ==
- Montour's Island in Allegheny County, Pennsylvania, was granted to him for service and named for him. He sold it during his lifetime.
- Montour County, Pennsylvania, was named for him.
- Montoursville, Pennsylvania, was named for his mother, as it developed near the village where she lived.
- The Montour School District, a comprehensive public school system located 16 miles west of Pittsburgh, Pennsylvania, also bears his name.

== See also ==
- Montour family

== Bibliography ==
- Hagedorn, Nancy L. "'Faithful, Knowing, and Prudent': Andrew Montour As Interpreter and Cultural Broker, 1740–1772". In Margaret Connell Szasz, ed., Between Indian and White Worlds: The Cultural Broker, 44–60. University of Oklahoma Press, 1994.
- Kelly, Kevin P. "John Montour: Life of a Cultural Go-Between". Colonial Williamsburg Interpreter, Volume 21, No. 4 (2000/01).
- Lewin, Howard. "A Frontier Diplomat: Andrew Montour" (pdf). Pennsylvania History Volume 33, Number 2 (April 1966): 153–86.
- Merrell, James. "'The Cast of His Countenance': Reading Andrew Montour." In Ronald Hoffman, et al., eds., Through a Glass Darkly: Reflections on Personal Identity in Early America, 13–39. Chapel Hill: University of North Carolina Press, 199.
- Wallace, Paul A. W. "Indians In Pennsylvania" p. 179.
- Merell, James H. " Into the American Woods: Negotiators on the Pennsylvania Frontier" W.W. Norton & Company 1999
