= Catherine Montour =

Haudenosaunee leader in Western New York (d. 1791)

Catharine Montour, also known as Queen Catharine (died after 1791), was a prominent Haudenosaunee leader living in Queanettquaga, a Seneca village of Sheaquaga, informally called Catharine's Town, in western New York. She has often been confused with Elizabeth "Madame" Montour, her aunt or grandmother who was a noted interpreter and adviser to the governor, and with "Queen Esther" Montour, usually described as her sister. Several places in western New York were later named in her honor, after most of the Haudenosaunee had been forced to cede their lands and were driven out of the region.

== Early life ==
Catharine was likely born in Pennsylvania or New York as the daughter of Marguerite Fafard Turpin, a Haudenosaunee-French métis also known as Margaret Montour or "French Margaret." Margaret was either the daughter or niece of Madame Montour. Catharine's father was Katarioniecha, also known as Peter Quebec. He was described as a Caughnawaga Mohawk, referring to converted Catholic Mohawk who lived in the Jesuit mission village now known as Kahnawake. It was founded south of Montreal across the St. Lawrence River in Quebec in the early 18th century.

Catharine had a sister named Mary (or Molly), and two brothers: Andrew Montour and Nicholas Quebec. (Her brother Andrew should not be confused with Andrew Montour (c. 1720–1772), who was the son of Elizabeth "Madame" Montour and was probably Catharine's uncle. He was a well-known interpreter in the backcountry of Pennsylvania and Virginia.)

== Marriage and family ==
Catharine Montour married a Seneca chief named Telenemut, also known as Thomas Hudson. She and her husband lived in the Finger Lakes region at Queanettquaga, a Seneca town that became known as Catharine's Town. After the village was destroyed by rebel continental forces during the 1779 Sullivan Expedition in the American Revolutionary War, Montour relocated with other Seneca to Niagara. This area was held by the British at the time, although it later became part of New York state. When Schuyler County in western New York was settled by European Americans following the revolution and United States independence, they named several places after Catharine Montour.

Historical references to Catharine in her later years are few. In 1791, Catharine's sister Mary sought permission to live at the Moravian mission village of New Salem, near present Milan, Ohio. Missionary David Zeisberger recorded at the time that Catharine Montour was still living near Niagara.

== Representation in media ==
"Catharine Montour" was the name of a fictional leading character of a 1917 silent film, The Spirit of '76. She was portrayed as a mistress of King George of Great Britain and an adventuress in America.

== Legacy and honors ==
Several places in New York were named after Montour in the period of European-American settlement following the American Revolution, all in Schuyler County.

- Catharine, New York
- Catharine Creek
- Montour, New York
- Montour Falls, New York

== See also ==
- Montour family

== Bibliography ==
- Sivertsen, Barbara J. Turtles, Wolves, and Bears: A Mohawk Family History, Westminster, Maryland: Heritage Books, 1996.
