= Nicholas Montour =

Canadian politician

Nicholas Montour (1756 – August 6, 1808) was a fur trader, seigneur, and political figure in Lower Canada.

== Early life ==
He was born in the province of New York in 1756, the son of Andrew Montour and Sally Ainse, and the grandson of Madame Montour. In 1774, he was employed as a clerk in the fur trade by Joseph and Benjamin Frobisher on the Churchill River in what is now Manitoba and later worked in what is now Saskatchewan. Montour owned shares in the North West Company. In 1792, he retired from the fur trade with a fortune of £20,000 and settled at Montreal where he was a member of the Beaver Club.

In 1794, he bought the Montreal Distillery Company from Isaac Todd and his partners. In 1795, he purchased the seigneuries of Pointe-du-Lac (also known as Normanville or Tonnancour) and Gastineau. Montour also owned land along the Thames River in Upper Canada, which he inherited from his mother. He also purchased and later sold the seigneuries of Pierreville and Rivière-David (also called Deguire). In 1796, Montour was elected to the Legislative Assembly of Lower Canada for Saint-Maurice. He was named a justice of the peace for Trois-Rivières district in 1799. In the same year, he took up residence at Pointe-du-Lac, where he built a handsome dwelling house and large flour and saw mills. He might have increased his fortune by a great extent, but his style of living and free and generous disposition led to the loss of his money.

== Death ==
He died on the seigneury of Pointe-du-Lac in 1808 and was buried at Trois-Rivières.

== Personal life ==
His son, also named Nicholas, went on to work for the Hudson's Bay Company.

== See also ==
- Montour family

Political offices
Preceded by Augustin Rivard-Dufresne, Parti Canadien; Thomas Coffin, Tory	MLA, District of Saint-Maurice; 1796–1800; With: Thomas Coffin, Tory	Succeeded by Mathew Bell, Tory; Thomas Coffin, Tory
