= Sally Ainse =

Oneida diplomat, interpreter, and fur trader leader

Personal details
- Born: c. 1728
- Died: 1823
- Spouse: Andrew Montour
- Children: Nicholas Montour
- Known for: Helped with peace negotiations after the Battle of Fallen Timbers; liaison for Joseph Brant
- Nickname(s): Sally Montour, Sara Montour, Sara Hands, Sara Hains, Sara Willson, and Sarah Hance

Sally Ainse (also known as Sally Montour, Sara Montour, Sara Hands, Sara Hains, Sara Willson, and Sarah Hance) (c. 1728–1823) was an Oneida diplomat and fur trader, who was most commonly known as Sally throughout her life.

As a girl she lived near the Susquehanna River, likely near the Pennsylvania and New York border. She was married to Andrew Montour when she was a teenager. They separated in 1756. He received custody of most of their children, who were sent to live with people in Pennsylvania. Around the time of the separation, she was pregnant with her youngest child, Nicholas, who was raised by Ainse. He was baptized at Albany, New York on October 31, 1756. She lived with Nicholas in a Oneida settlement near the Mohawk River.

She became owner of a deed for the land where Fort Stanwix was located, receiving the deed from the Oneida. However, Ainse was unsuccessful in having the colonial government of New York honor her land claim. In 1772, Sir William Johnson rejected her Oneida deed and procured the land for a cartel of his friends. She expanded her trade west into the Great Lakes, trading with the Mississaugas on the north side of Lake Erie in 1766 and living at Michilimackinac, where she traded in rum and other goods. She regularly traveled between Michilimackinac, Detroit, and New York for trade and had a relationship with William Maxwell, the fort's commissary.

She moved to Detroit around 1775, during the time of the American Revolution. She expanded her business, trading in furs, cider, and other goods, and became more commonly known as Sally Ainse. She purchased a house and lot for 120 pounds New York Currency in 1778. The lot was sixteen feet wide, and the following year, Ainse bought the neighboring lot for 80 pounds New York Currency, making her lots a total of thirty-two feet wide. In the 1779 census she owned cows, horses, one hundred pounds of flour and four slaves, likely of African and native descent. In the 1782 Detroit census, she was recorded as owning one female slave, an increased number of livestock, flour, and corn.

In 1782, Ainse made the largest land purchase of her life, acquiring 1600 acres of land on the north shore of the Thames River from Ojibwe people. In 1787, Ainse had sold her property in Detroit and had begun living on land she acquired in 1783 near present-day Chatham, Ontario. She brought at least one slave with her, who was sold in 1789, and she likely brought more as she had had a house built, along with farms, an Indian corn field, and an orchard. She continued to trade in the Detroit region and also performed political work, serving as an ally, liaison, and messenger to Joseph Brant during the Northwest Indian War and negotiations leading up to the Treaty of Greenville. In 1794 she helped with peace negotiations after the Battle of Fallen Timbers. She also served as a liaison for and the British. In 1790, the Indian Department acquired the land from the Ojibwe in the McKee Purchase, though chief negotiator Alexander McKee refused to acknowledge that Ainse was the owner of the land even though the Ojibwe repeatedly stated Ainse's land was exempt from the purchase. Ainse continued to make legal attempts to have her ownership recognized in 1808, 1809, 1813, and 1815, when the Executive Council of Upper Canada claimed she was dead. Ainse left her property and moved to Amherstburg, Ontario. where she died in 1823.
