= Montour, New York =

- Town
- Location within the state of New York
- Coordinates: 42°20′24″N 76°50′3″W
- Country: United States
- State: New York
- County: Schuyler

Area
  - Total: 18.58 sq mi (48.13 km^{2})
  - Land: 18.58 sq mi (48.12 km^{2})
  - Water: 0.0039 sq mi (0.01 km^{2})
- Elevation: 741 ft (226 m)

Population (2020)
  - Total: 2,323
  - Estimate (2024): 2,206
  - Density: 125.0/sq mi (48.28/km^{2})
- Time zone: UTC-5 (Eastern (EST))
  - Summer (DST): UTC-4 (EDT)
- Area code: 607
- FIPS code: 36-48186
- GNIS feature ID: 0979233
- Website: https://www.townofmontourny.com/

Montour is a town in Schuyler County, New York, United States. The population was 2,323 at the 2020 census. The town is one of two towns in the county named after Catherine Montour.

The Town of Montour is in the southern part of the county and is north of Elmira.

== History ==
The Seneca village of Queanettquaga, also known by colonial settlers as Catherine's Town, was destroyed by the Sullivan Expedition in 1779. These colonial forces ranged throughout western New York, destroying Iroquois villages as well as their stores of crops. They were destitute when winter arrived.

The Town of Montour was first settled by European Americans around 1794 after the American Revolutionary War. They first settled the current village of Montour Falls, named after a waterfall along one edge. This was known by the Seneca as Che-qua-gah, or "roaring water."

The Chemung Canal was completed in 1833 and passed through the town, connecting it to other waterways. This declined in use after railroads were built through the state.

Montour was the last town organized in the county, created in 1860 from part of the Town of Catharine.

The Lee School was listed on the National Register of Historic Places in 1998.

== Geography ==
According to the United States Census Bureau, the town has a total area of 18.6 square miles (48 km^{2}), of which, 18.6 square miles (48 km^{2}) is land and 0.03% is water.

The southern town line is the border of Chemung County.

The town is south of Seneca Lake, one of the Finger Lakes.

New York State Route 14 intersects New York State Route 224 in Montour Falls. NY-14 runs southward through the Catharine Creek Valley, following the same route as the former Chemung Canal.

== Demographics ==
Historical population
Census	Pop.	Note	%±
1870	1,828		—
1880	1,771		−3.1%
1890	1,987		12.2%
1900	1,623		−18.3%
1910	1,608		−0.9%
1920	1,967		22.3%
1930	1,868		−5.0%
1940	1,774		−5.0%
1950	1,985		11.9%
1960	2,182		9.9%
1970	2,324		6.5%
1980	2,607		12.2%
1990	2,528		−3.0%
2000	2,446		−3.2%
2010	2,308		−5.6%
2020	2,323		0.6%
2024 (est.)	2,206		−5.0%
U.S. Decennial Census

As of the census of 2000, there were 2,446 people, 1,005 households, and 658 families residing in the town. The population density was 131.3 inhabitants per square mile (50.7/km^{2}). There were 1,078 housing units at an average density of 57.9 per square mile (22.4/km^{2}). The racial makeup of the town was 97.96% White, 0.74% African American, 0.33% Native American, 0.16% Asian, 0.08% Pacific Islander, and 0.74% from two or more races. Hispanic or Latino of any race were 0.33% of the population.

There were 1,005 households, out of which 26.7% had children under the age of 18 living with them, 50.3% were married couples living together, 10.0% had a female householder with no husband present, and 34.5% were non-families. 28.3% of all households were made up of individuals, and 17.2% had someone living alone who was 65 years of age or older. The average household size was 2.31 and the average family size was 2.80.

In the town, the population was spread out, with 21.1% under the age of 18, 7.4% from 18 to 24, 26.5% from 25 to 44, 24.3% from 45 to 64, and 20.7% who were 65 years of age or older. The median age was 42 years. For every 100 females, there were 86.0 males. For every 100 females age 18 and over, there were 80.0 males.

The median income for a household in the town was $33,879, and the median income for a family was $42,303. Males had a median income of $30,774 versus $21,618 for females. The per capita income for the town was $16,983. About 8.1% of families and 11.7% of the population were below the poverty line, including 15.6% of those under age 18 and 6.5% of those age 65 or over.

== Communities and locations in the Town of Montour ==
- Catharine Creek – a stream flowing northward to Seneca Lake. It was partially rerouted to form the Chemung Canal.
- Catharine Creek Wildlife Management Area – A conservation area in the northern part of Montour.
- Deckertown – A hamlet southeast of Montour Falls.
- Montour Falls (formerly "Havana") – Most of the Village of Montour Falls is at the western town line.
- Watkins Glen – A small eastern part of the Village of Watkins Glen is at the western town line by Seneca Lake.
