= Rupert, Pennsylvania =

Unincorporated community in Pennsylvania, US

- Census-designated place
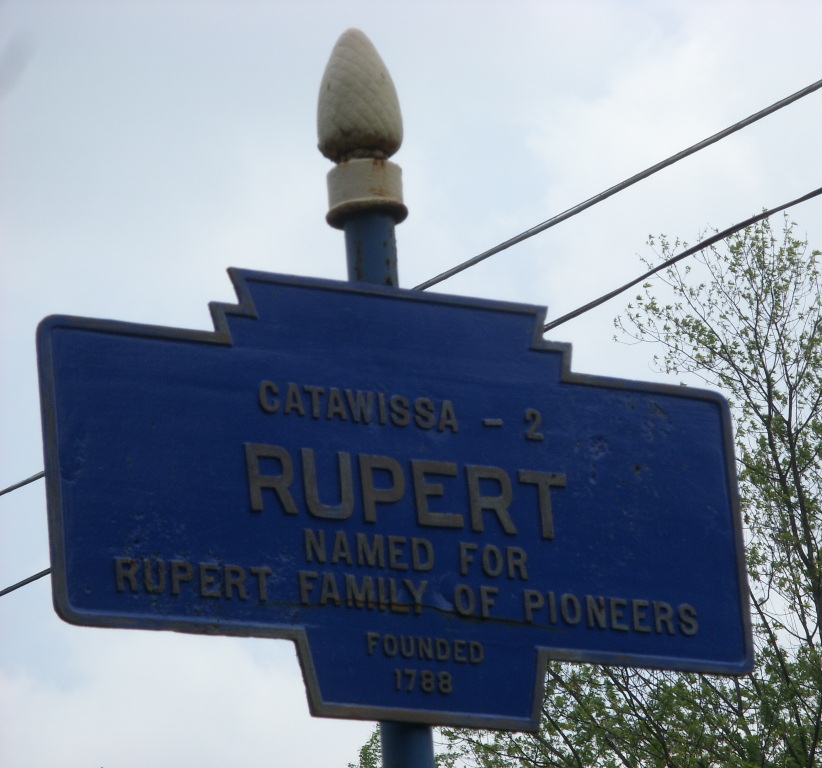
- Keystone Marker

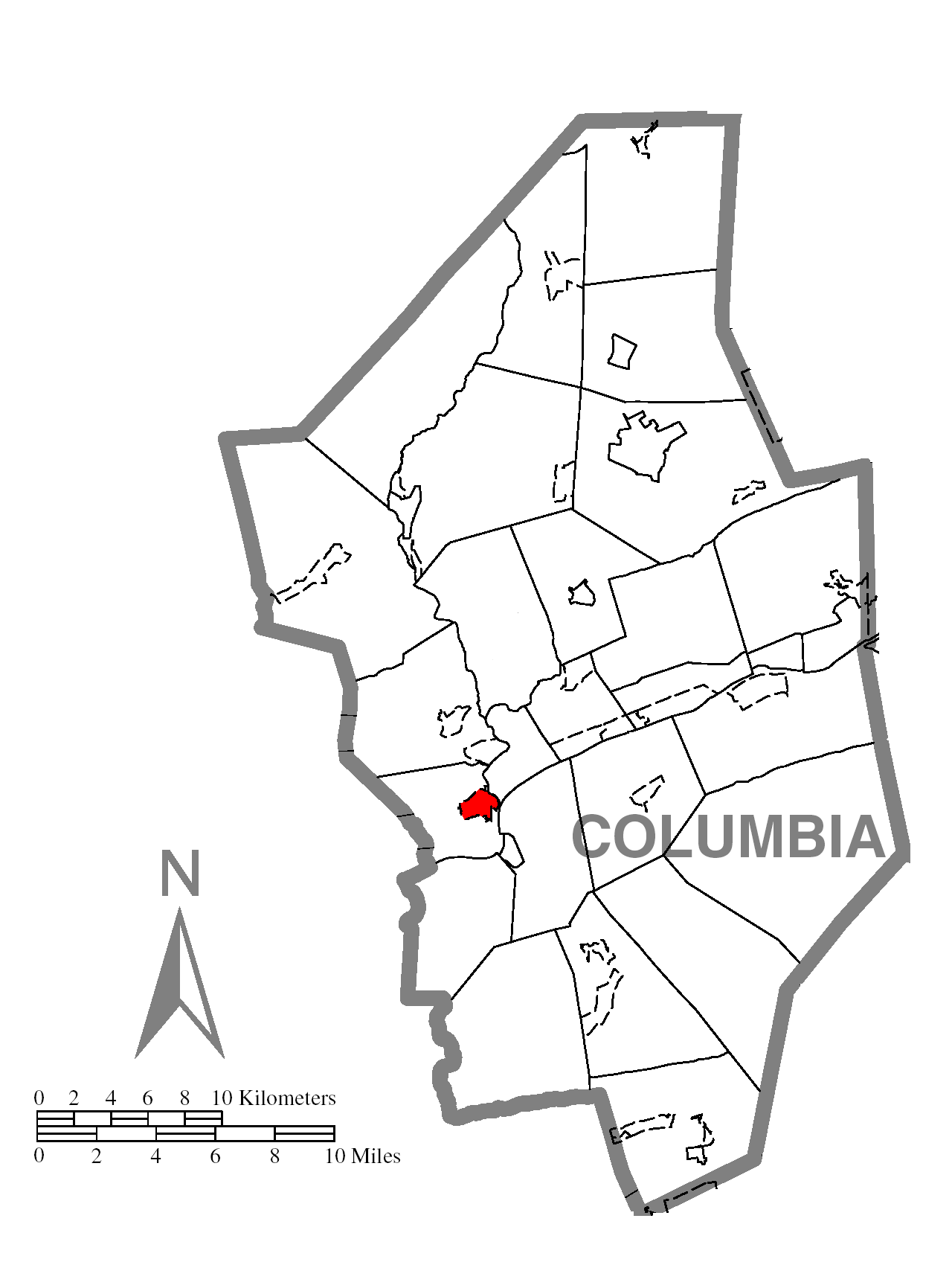
- Location within Columbia County

- Location within the U.S. state of Pennsylvania
- Coordinates: 40°58′44″N 76°28′28″W
- Country: United States
- State: Pennsylvania
- County: Columbia
- Township: Montour

Area
  - Total: 0.93 sq mi (2.4 km^{2})
  - Land: 0.89 sq mi (2.3 km^{2})
  - Water: 0.039 sq mi (0.1 km^{2})
- Elevation: 510 ft (160 m)

Population (2020)
  - Total: 154
  - Density: 202/sq mi (78.1/km^{2})
- Time zone: UTC-5 (Eastern (EST))
  - Summer (DST): UTC-4 (EDT)
- ZIP Code: 17815
- FIPS code: 42-66696
- GNIS feature ID: 1204556

Rupert is a census-designated place (CDP) in Columbia County, Pennsylvania, United States. It is part of Northeastern Pennsylvania. The population was 154 at the 2020 census. It is part of the Bloomsburg-Berwick micropolitan area.

== Geography ==
Rupert is located in west-central Columbia County at 40°58′44″N 76°28′28″W (40.978965, -76.474524), on the west side of Fishing Creek near its confluence with the Susquehanna River. It is in the eastern part of Montour Township, across Fishing Creek from Bloomsburg, the county seat.

According to the U.S. Census Bureau, Rupert has a total area of 0.93 square miles (2.4 km^{2}), of which 0.89 square miles (2.3 km^{2}) is land and 0.04 square miles (0.1 km^{2}), or 3.82%, is water. Rupert is flat in the east and has steep hills in the west. Most of the CDP contains forest, but there are some agricultural and residential areas in the northeastern part.

Pennsylvania Route 42 runs through the center of Rupert, leading north 0.5 miles (0.80 km) to U.S. Route 11 at a point 2 miles (3 km) southwest of the center of Bloomsburg. PA 42 leads south from Rupert 2.5 miles (4.0 km) to Catawissa on the southeastern bank of the Susquehanna.

== Demographics ==
As of the census of 2000, there were 174 people, 72 households, and 49 families residing in the CDP. The population density was 192.0 inhabitants per square mile (74.1/km^{2}). There were 77 housing units at an average density of 85.0 per square mile (32.8/km^{2}). The racial makeup of the CDP was 97.70% White, 0.57% African American, 1.72% from other races. Hispanic or Latino of any race were 4.60% of the population.

There were 72 households, out of which 27.8% had children under the age of 18 living with them, 56.9% were married couples living together, 5.6% had a female householder with no husband present, and 30.6% were non-families. 29.2% of all households were made up of individuals, and 13.9% had someone living alone who was 65 years of age or older. The average household size was 2.42 and the average family size was 2.96.

In the CDP, the population was spread out, with 23.6% under the age of 18, 8.6% from 18 to 24, 25.9% from 25 to 44, 27.6% from 45 to 64, and 14.4% who were 65 years of age or older. The median age was 40 years. For every 100 females, there were 93.3 males. For every 100 females age 18 and over, there were 95.6 males.

The median income for a household in the CDP was $32,321, and the median income for a family was $46,667. Males had a median income of $33,438 versus $24,583 for females. The per capita income for the CDP was $20,412. None of the families and 3.4% of the population were living below the poverty line, including no under eighteens and 9.5% of those over 64.

== Education ==
The school district is Bloomsburg Area School District.
