= Grovania, Pennsylvania =

Unincorporated community in Pennsylvania, U.S.

Coordinates: 40°58′26″N 76°31′30″W

Grovania is an unincorporated community in Columbia County, in the U.S. state of Pennsylvania.

== History ==
Grovania had its start when the railroad was extended to that point. The community was named for the Grove Brothers, owners of a local blast furnace.
