= Onondaga (village) =

Capital of the Haudenosaunee Confederacy

Rough location of the village as of 2026

Onondaga (known in Onondaga as Onoñ·dá’geh, transl. 'on the hill') was a city that served as the capital of the Haudenosaunee Confederacy and the primary settlement of the Onondaga people. It was the meeting place of the Haudenosaunee Grand Council. The clan mothers named the men representing the clans at village and tribal councils and appointed the 50 Rotiyanehson who met here periodically as the ruling council for the confederated Five Nations.

The location of the city changed periodically. In 1600, it was located near present Cazenovia, New York. From 1609 to 1615, it was situated the site of present-day Pompey, New York. After that, Onondaga was located at several sites near present Delphi Falls, New York, until 1640, when it moved to what developed as present-day Manlius, New York.

In 1720, it was moved to Onondaga Creek. After many Onondaga warrior bands had sided with the British in the American Revolutionary War, the Continental Army attacked the city of Onondaga in an expedition led by Col. Goose Van Schaick. In April 1779, the Onondaga of the settlement, mostly older men, women and children, fled as the army approached. American troops methodically destroyed the abandoned settlement, razing about 50 houses along Onondaga Creek and burning winter stores.

The present meeting place of the Haudenosaunee Grand Council is on the Onondaga Reservation in New York.
