= Montour Township, Pennsylvania =

Township in Pennsylvania, US

Coordinates: 40°58′00″N 76°30′59″W

- Township
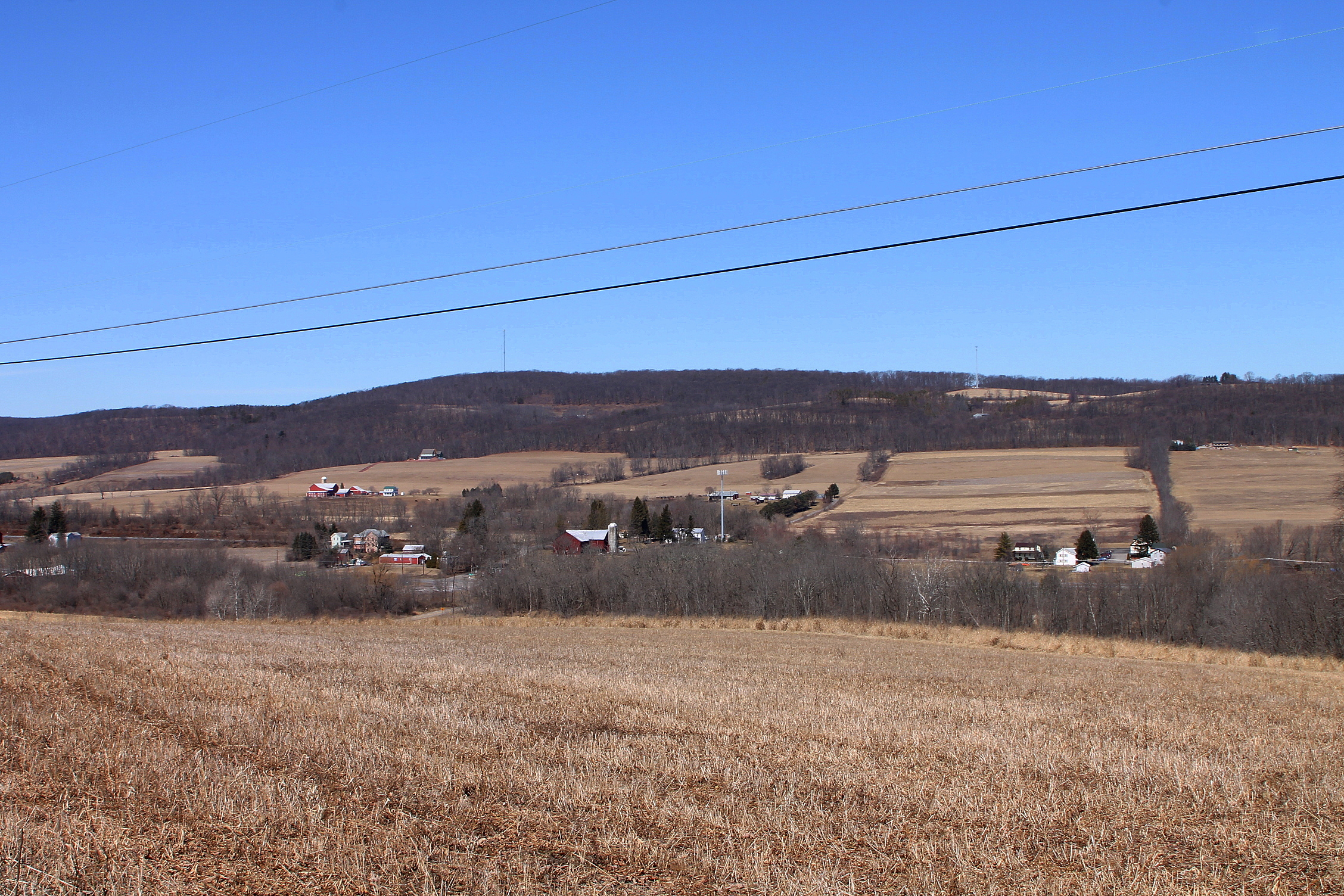
- The Dutch Valley in Montour Township

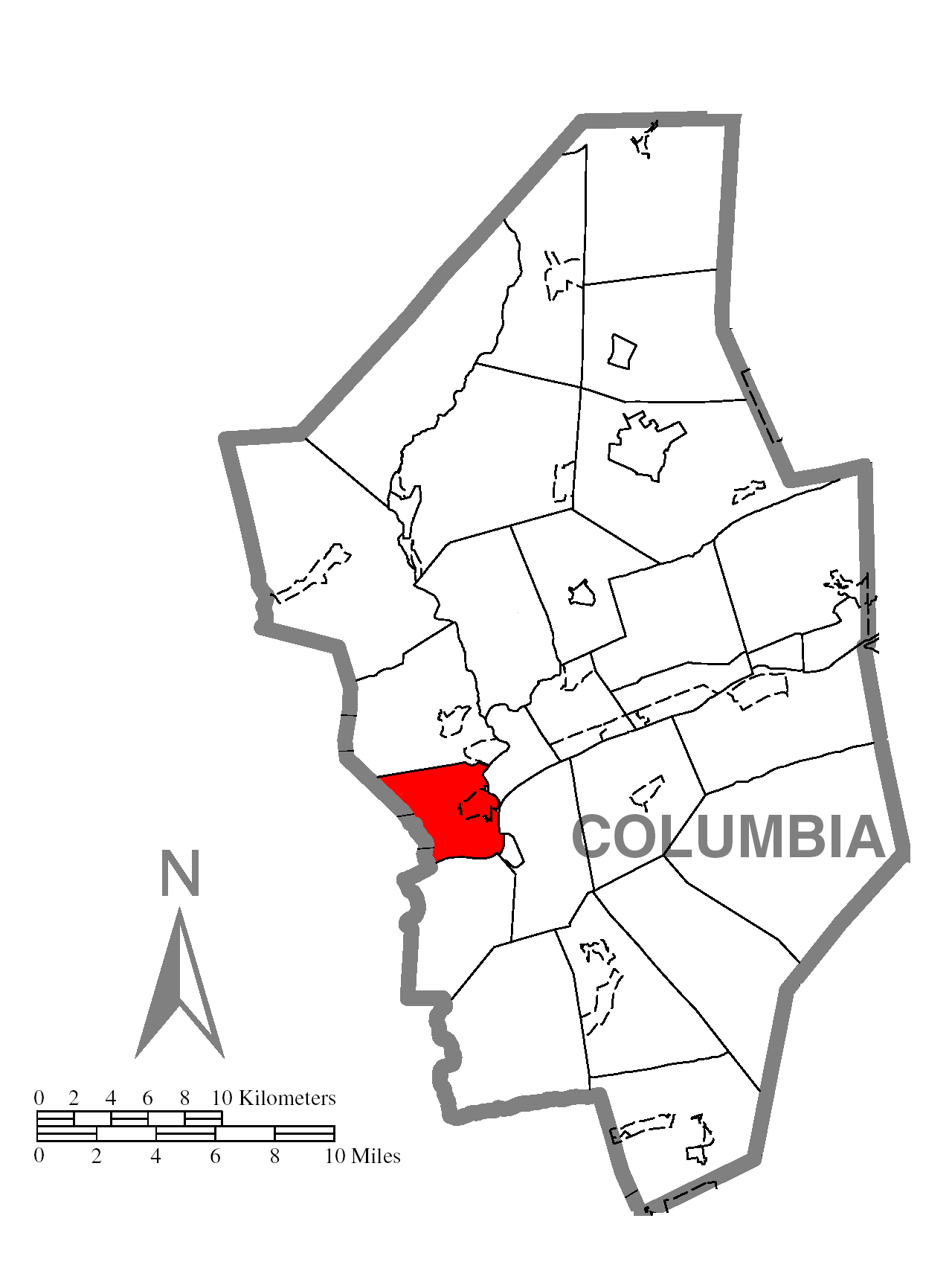
- Map of Columbia County, Pennsylvania highlighting Montour Township

- Map of Columbia County, Pennsylvania
- Country: United States
- State: Pennsylvania
- County: Columbia
- Settled: 1788
- Incorporated: 1837

Area
  - Total: 9.60 sq mi (24.87 km^{2})
  - Land: 9.15 sq mi (23.71 km^{2})
  - Water: 0.45 sq mi (1.16 km^{2})

Population (2020)
  - Total: 1,263 ▼
  - Estimate (2021): 1,263
  - Density: 142.9/sq mi (55.17/km^{2})
- Time zone: UTC-5 (Eastern (EST))
  - Summer (DST): UTC-4 (EDT)
- Area code: 570
- FIPS code: 42-037-50704
- Website: montourtownship.org

Montour Township is a township in Columbia County, Pennsylvania. It is part of Northeastern Pennsylvania.

The population was 1,263 at the time of the 2020 census.

== History ==
The Rupert Covered Bridge No. 56 was listed on the National Register of Historic Places in 1979.

== Geography ==
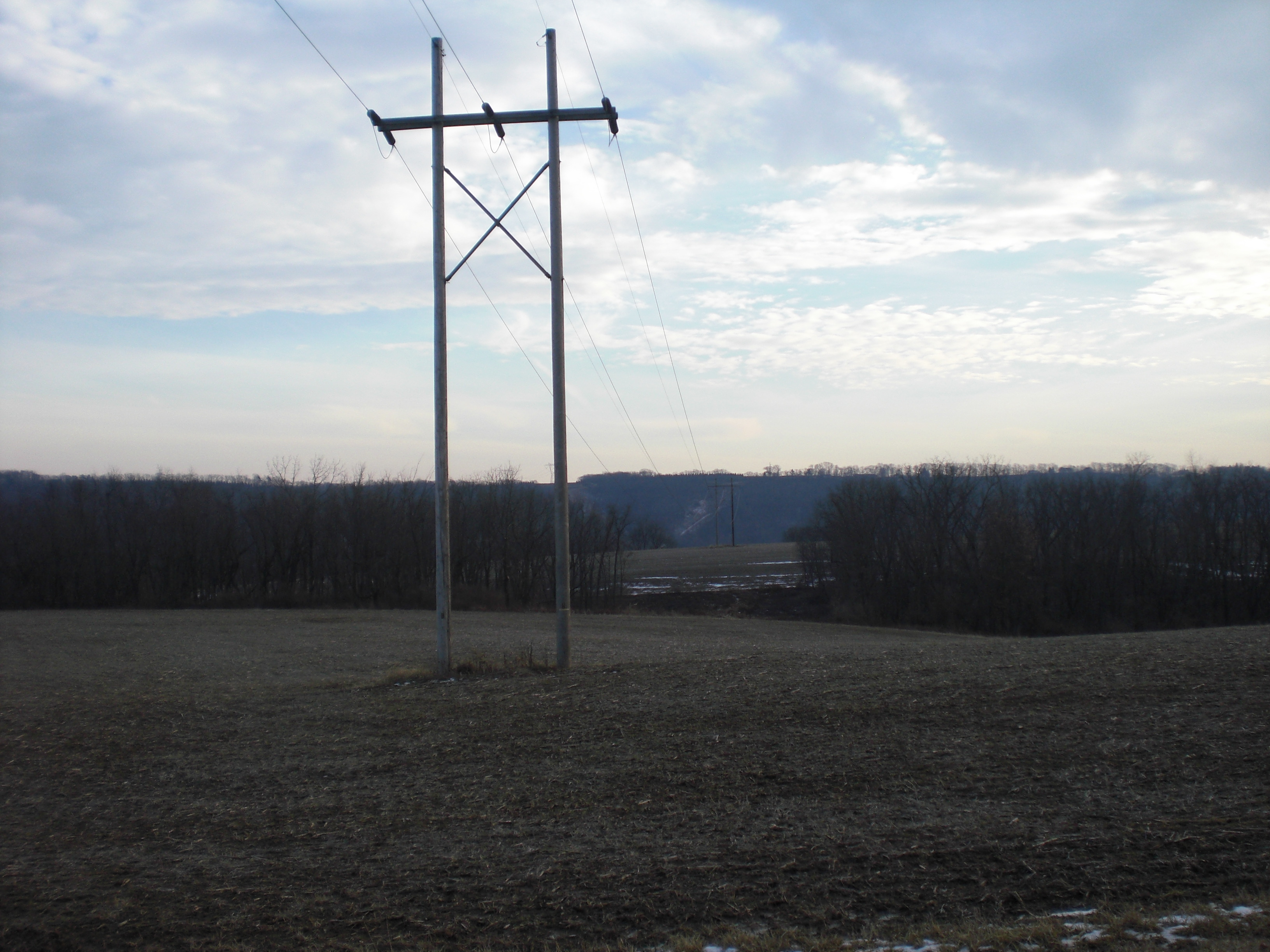
Scenery in Montour Township

Montour Township is in western Columbia County, bordered on the west by Montour County. The Susquehanna River forms the southern and part of the eastern boundary, and Fishing Creek forms the remainder of the eastern boundary, separating the township from the town of Bloomsburg, the county seat.

The unincorporated community of Rupert is located in the eastern part of the township, near the mouth of Fishing Creek.

According to the United States Census Bureau, the township has a total area of 9.6 square miles (24.9 km^{2}), of which 9.2 square miles (23.7 km^{2}) is land and 0.46 square miles (1.2 km^{2}), or 4.68%, is water.

== Demographics ==
Historical population
Census	Pop.	Note	%±
2010	1,344		—
2020	1,263		−6.0%
2021 (est.)	1,263		0.0%

As of the census of 2000, there were 1,437 people, 592 households, and 425 families residing in the township.

The population density was 155.9 inhabitants per square mile (60.2/km^{2}). There were 612 housing units at an average density of 66.4 per square mile (25.6/km^{2}).

The racial makeup of the township was 97.91% White, 0.42% African American, 0.14% Native American, 0.21% Asian, 0.21% from other races, and 1.11% from two or more races. Hispanic or Latino of any race were 0.84% of the population.

There were 592 households, out of which 29.1% had children under the age of eighteen living with them; 57.8% were married couples living together, 8.4% had a female householder with no husband present, and 28.2% were non-families. 23.6% of all households were made up of individuals, and 9.6% had someone living alone who was sixty-five years of age or older.

The average household size was 2.43 and the average family size was 2.84.

In the township the population was spread out, with 22.3% under the age of eighteen, 7.0% from eighteen to twenty-four, 26.9% from twenty-five to forty-four, 27.1% from forty-five to sixty-four, and 16.7% who were sixty-five years of age or older. The median age was forty-two years.

For every one hundred females, there were 96.6 males. For every one hundred females aged eighteen and over, there were 96.3 males.

The median income for a household in the township was $38,125, and the median income for a family was $42,583. Males had a median income of $31,250 compared with that of $22,868 for females.

The per capita income for the township was $18,670.

Roughly 7.8% of families and 10.1% of the population were living below the poverty line, including 13.3% of those who were under the age of eighteen and 6.0% of those aged sixty-five or over.
