= Nicolas Antoine II Coulon de Villiers =

Nicolas Antoine II Coulon de Villiers (25 June 1708 – 3 April 1750) was a French military officer from an influential military family in the King George's War (1744–1748) in North America.

He was born in Contrecœur, Quebec, son of Nicolas-Antoine Coulon de Villiers and Angelique Jarret de Verchères. His brothers were Louis Coulon de Villiers, François Coulon de Villiers and Joseph Coulon de Jumonville.

In his youth, he fought against the sauks and became commander of Fort St. Joseph (Niles, Michigan), Michigan, after the death of his father in battle. In 1742, he returned to Quebec and married on 7 October 1743, Madeleine-Marie-Anne Tarieu de La Pérade, widow of Richard Testu de La Richardière, who had died in Quebec on October 24, 1741.

In 1746, he was posted as captain in Acadia and won an important victory against a larger British force in the Battle of Grand Pré on 1 February 1747. For this, he was awarded the Order of Saint Louis, with an 800-livre gratuity, by the King of France. He was also appointed major of Trois-Rivières.

Coulon de Villiers had his left arm shattered by a musket ball during the battle. He went to France for treatment of his wound at a thermal spring. After his return to Canada in 1749, after amputation of his wounded arm, he died and was buried at Montréal on 4 April 1750.

== Sources ==
Dictionary of Canadian Biography
