= Nicolas Antoine Coulon de Villiers =

Coat-of-Arms Coulon de Villiers (1594)

Nicolas Antoine Coulon, chevalier de Villiers (1683 – September 1733) was a military officer in New France.

== Biography ==
Born in the Province of Brittany and baptized March 20, 1683 in Nantes, he was the son of Raoul-Guillaume Coulon, sieur de Villiers and Louise de Lafosse (m.1677, Beaumont-sur-Oise). Nicolas Antoine arrived in Quebec in 1703. In 1705, he married Angelique Jarret de Verchères (daughter of François Jarret de Verchères and Marie Perrot and sister of Madeleine) in Quebec. At some time before 1718, Nicolas may have married Mme de La Chesaigne.

In 1715, he became a lieutenant in the French army. From 1725 to 1730, Nicolas was the officer in command of Fort Saint Joseph. From this fort, he commanded, in August 1730, a regiment of Canadiens and Amerindians against Fort Mesquakie of the Fox, constructed 60 leagues south of Lake Michigan, and joined the forces of Canadians at Fort Chartres and Fort Miami to prepare for the extermination of this tribe. In January 1731, the survivors of this campaign went to Nicolas Antoine at Fort Saint-Joseph, and later in the year, they accompanied them to Montreal, where Governor Marquis de Beauharnois forgave them. (The writings of de Montigny at Michilimackinac). From 1731 until his death - he was killed by a Sauk in September 1733 - he commanded and rebuilt the fort at La Baye in Wisconsin.

== Children ==
He had seven sons of whom four joined the army. He also had six daughters.

- Nicolas Antoine II Coulon de Villiers (1708-1750), won the Battle of Grand Pré
- Louis Coulon de Villiers (1710-1757), won the Battle of Fort Necessity
- François Coulon de Villiers (1712-1794), fought in the Battle of Fort Duquesne
- Joseph Coulon de Jumonville (1718-1754), killed at the Battle of Jumonville Glen
