= François Coulon de Villiers =

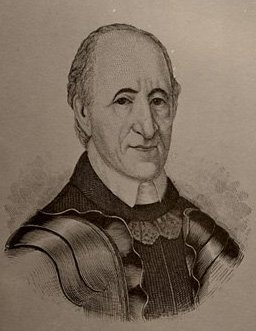
- Born: 1712; Montreal or Verchères
- Died: 22 May 1794 (aged 81–82); New Orleans, Spanish Louisiana

François Coulon de Villiers (1712 – 22 May 1794) was a French military officer from an influential military family in the French and Indian War and then an influential officer in the New Spain community of New Orleans.

== Overview ==
He was born in Verchères, Quebec, the son of Nicolas-Antoine Coulon de Villiers and Angelique Jarret de Verchères. In 1744, he was the first commandant of Fort de Cavagnal on the bluffs above the Missouri River, in what was then known as the Illinois country of upper Louisiana, near modern-day Fort Leavenworth, Kansas. It was the furthest west of the French forts in Louisiana (New France).

A member of a military family, his brother Joseph Coulon de Jumonville was slaughtered while in custody of George Washington in what has been called the Battle of Jumonville Glen in 1754. The incident ignited the Seven Years' War, also known as the French and Indian War in the United States. Another of his brothers, Louis Coulon de Villiers, defeated Washington in the next battle of the campaign in the Battle of the Great Meadows. It marked the only time Washington had to sue for peace in battle.

Villiers served in many of battles of the war, including the Battle of Fort Duquesne. He was captured in the Battle of Fort Niagara, and had to be exchanged.

After its ultimate defeat in the war, France ceded Louisiana to Spain in the Treaty of Paris (1763). From that time on, Villiers served in various capacities for New Spain, including commandant at Fort St. Jean-Baptiste at Natchitoches in lower Louisiana, and Alcalde for New Orleans, Louisiana. He died May 22, 1794, in New Orleans.
