= Jumonville (Pennsylvania) =

Methodist camp in Pennsylvania, U.S.

Coordinates: 39.88757°N 79.64960°W

The Jumonville Camp & Retreat Center is a United Methodist camp and retreat center located in Fayette County, Pennsylvania, United States, it sits on Chestnut Ridge, approximately 5 miles east of the city of Uniontown, Pennsylvania.

== History ==
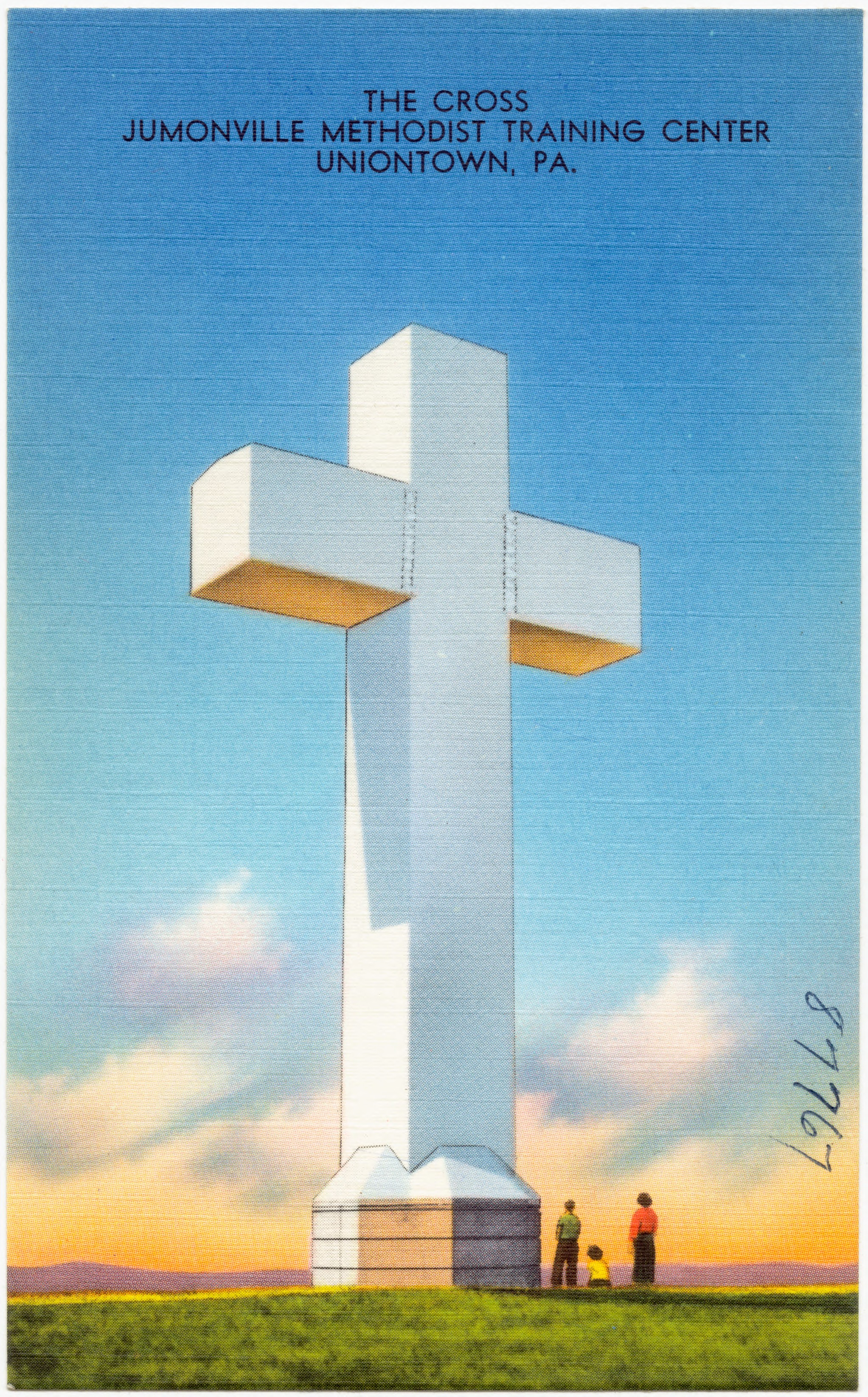
Cross on 1950s postcard

The campus was developed as the Pennsylvania Soldier's Orphan School after the American Civil War. The school was moved from the old Madison College in Uniontown up to the mountain location with fresh air and a healthier environment for the children. The school operated from 1875 until 1908. The Whyel Chapel was built in 1880. Students were fed, clothed, and educated, and graduated at 16 years old with a trade or skill to support themselves.

The property eventually passed through several British owners. It was donated by Harry Whyel to the Pittsburgh Conference of the Methodist Church, dedicated on August 2, 1941, and consisted at that time of 180 acres (73 ha) and 11 buildings. It is named after Joseph Coulon de Villiers de Jumonville, who was killed during a skirmish with George Washington at the Battle of Jumonville Glen that set off the French and Indian War.

The facility operated as a summer-only camp until 1970 and has hosted retreats and summer camps since then.

=== Cross ===
Jumonville contains a 60-foot-tall (18 m) cross that stands on top of Dunbar's Knob (elevation 2,480 feet [760 m]). It is visible from seven counties, three states, and 50 miles (80 km) on a clear day.

Thousands of Sunday School children contributed nickels and dimes to help build the cross, and their names are sealed in the 183-ton concrete foundation. It was fabricated by Moore Metal Works of Greensburg and erected on August 26, 1950. Dedication services were held on September 9. The cross arms project 12 feet (3.7 m) on each side of the main shaft. The cross weighs 55 tons and was designed to withstand winds up to 100 miles per hour (160 km/h).

== See also ==
- Battle of the Great Meadows
- Fort Necessity
