= Benjamin Goldthwait =

British army officer (1704–1761)

Benjamin Goldthwait Signature

Benjamin Goldthwait (1704–1761) was a British army officer who served in King George's War and the French and Indian War. He fought in the Siege of Louisbourg (1745) (along with his brother Joseph). He arrived in Annapolis Royal, Nova Scotia in 1746 and then fought in the Battle of Grand Pre. He then fought during the French and Indian War in the Battle of Fort Beauséjour.

His half-brother was Col. Thomas Goldthwait, commander at Fort Pownall (1763–1775). His brother, Ezekiel Goldthwait, was a prominent businessman in Boston with loyalist feelings, but who was also one of those who engaged lawyer James Otis, Jr. to challenge the British in the writs of assistance case of 1761.
