= Louis Coulon de Villiers =

French military officer (1710–1757)

- Born: August 17, 1710; Verchères, New France
- Died: November 2, 1757 (aged 47); Quebec City, New France
- Relatives: Nicolas Antoine Coulon de Villiers (father); Joseph Coulon de Jumonville (brother); Chevalier François Coulon de Villiers (brother)
- Military career
- Allegiance: New France
- Service years: 1733–1757
- Rank: Captain
- Unit: Posted to Fort Duquesne
- Conflicts: Battle of the Great Meadows, Battle of Grand Pré, Le Moyne de Bienville’s 1739 campaign

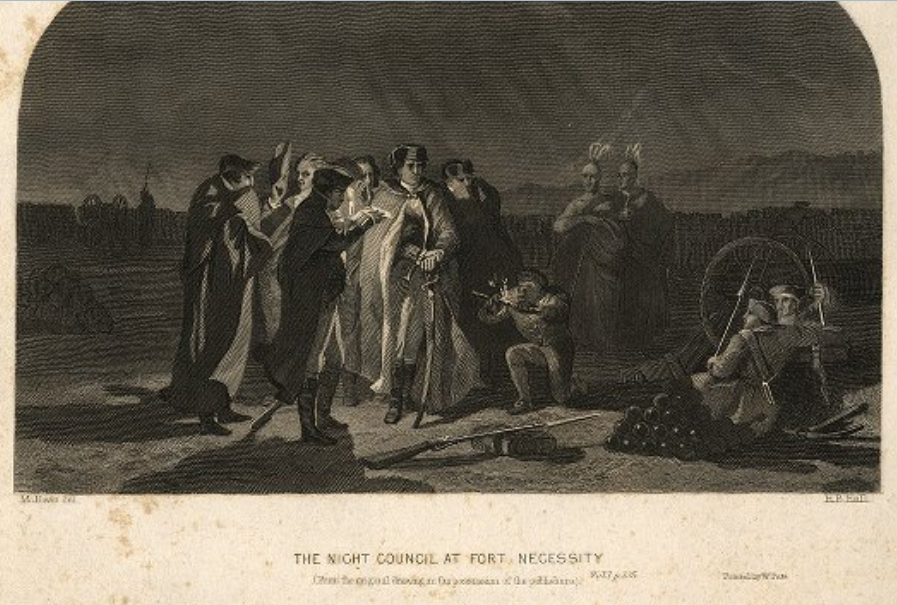
An engraving depicting the evening council of George Washington at Fort Necessity.

Louis Coulon, Sieur de Villiers (17 August 1710 – 2 November 1757) was a French military officer who served during the French and Indian War. Perhaps his greatest claim to fame is the fact that he is the only military opponent to force George Washington to surrender. Coulon was born into a prominent French Canadian family. His grandfather, Sieur Raoul-Guillaume Coulon, was an officer in the French Royal Army.

== Life ==
He was the son of Nicolas Antoine Coulon de Villiers and Elizabeth Le Couturier. Louis Coulon de Villiers entered the military in 1733. He had risen to the rank of captain by the outbreak of the French and Indian War and was assigned to Fort Duquesne.

His half-brother, Ensign Joseph Coulon de Jumonville, was killed at the Battle of Jumonville Glen after having surrendered to George Washington. Coulon sought revenge and led an expedition to attack the British garrison at Fort Necessity under Washington's command. On the morning of July 3, 1754, Coulon's troops laid siege to Fort Necessity. By evening, the garrison had asked for terms of surrender. It was the only time in Washington's long military career when he surrendered to an enemy. Coulon considered Washington personally responsible for his brother's death. He inserted a clause into the surrender document that described Jumonville's death as an "assassination". It reads:

Since our intention [as Canadiens] was never to disturb the peace and harmony which exist between two friends as two Prince allies, but only to avenge the assassination of one of our officers, messenger of a summon, and of his escorts, to prevent any establishment on the lands of His Majesty, the King of France, my master.

The garrison were allowed to return to the security of their land with the honours of war, and the promise that they leave their settlements to the west of the Allegheny Mountains during the twelve months that followed. They were made to promise the safe return of the prisoners taken during the attack on Joseph Coulon de Jumonville back to Fort Duquesne. The Canadiens also presented two prisoners, Robert Stobo and his interpreter, Jacob Van Braam, to demonstrate their respect of the clauses of surrender.

The following day, the garrison left in haste. So quickly did they leave, that Washington left behind his journal in his abandoned luggage. The French used this content and the articles of surrender to label Washington and his soldiers as self-admitted assassins. Washington denied having admitted to the murders. In accordance with his officers and colleagues, he maintained that the interpreter, when translating the act of surrender, had substituted the incriminating words of assassination by the words of death and killing. Washington's superiors further declared that they had no intention of respecting the document that Washington had signed. The Canadian prisoners were not released; Stobo reneged on his word and became a spy; and by the end of the year, Washington accompanied Major General Edward Braddock on an assault on Fort Duquesne.

In July and August 1756, Coulon led a column of French and Native Americans against the frontier of the Province of Pennsylvania. The expedition assaulted Fort Granville, near Lewistown, Pennsylvania, on August 2, and won the surrender of the fort on the following day. Coulon died of smallpox on November 2, 1757, at Quebec City.

== Popular culture ==
- In Timeless, in season 1, episode 7, the characters meet Louis Coulon de Villiers. The series states he had a son called Jacques, but in reality, he had a son called François.
