= Jacob Van Braam =

Dutch mercenary; military trainer and interpreter to George Washington

Jacobus van Braam (b. Bergen op Zoom, in the Dutch Republic, 1 April 1729, d. 1 August 1792 Charleville, France) was a sword master and mercenary who trained the 19-year-old George Washington in 1751 or shortly thereafter. He was also retained by Washington as a translator.

== Biography ==
Van Braam entered the British naval service and acted as lieutenant with Lawrence Washington, George Washington's elder half-brother. They served under Admiral Vernon in the 1741 expedition to Carthagena. Then Van Braam accompanied Lawrence Washington in 1742 to the house which would become Mount Vernon. After Robert Dinwiddie, the lieutenant governor of Virginia, appointed George Washington as a militia-leader for southern Virginia with the nominal rank of major in February 1753, Van Braam had the task of training him. Van Braam gave Washington much instruction as to fencing, flags, fortification and the armies of Europe. Lawrence Washington, who died in July 1752, also trained George, as did Lawrence's cronies, and an adjutant named "Muse" (no first-name given) who taught George the "evolution of arms" (drill manoeuvers). According to the 1855 biography of Washington by Washington Irving:

Another of Lawrence [Washington]'s campaigning comrades was Jacob Van Braam, a Dutchman by birth; a soldier of fortune of the Dalgetty order; who had been in the British Army, but was now out of service, and, professing to be a complete master of fence, recruited his slender purse in this time of military excitement, by giving the Virginian youth lessons in the sword exercise.
Under the instructions of [Lawrence and Van Braam] Mount Vernon, from being a quiet rural retreat, where Washington, three years previously, had indited love ditties to his "lowland beauty," was suddenly transformed into a school of arms, as he practised the manual exercise with Adjutant Muse, or took lessons on the broadsword from Van Braam.

Other biographers (including John Marshall) mention Van Braam only as "an interpreter" brought along on the preliminary diplomatic expeditions leading up to the culmination of his earlier actions against the French, and not as a longtime associate and instructor who campaigned with his brother and schooled George Washington in the art of the sword and other military matters. At the Battle of Great Meadows in July 1754,

The fort was handed over on July 4 and the bulk of British garrison were allowed to return to Maryland honorably. Van Braam and Captain Robert Stobo were retained by the French as a guarantee of compliance with the terms of surrender. The French burned the fort and returned to Fort Duquesne.

On account of his alleged wrong rendering of one word, Van Braam received more blame than praise for his services, while others made it the occasion for criticism of Washington himself. The voluminous controversy, which arose in the Virginia colonial legislature over Van Braam's asserted mistranslation, could hardly have arisen in New York, where the Dutch language was generally spoken, and the Netherlanders' association of ideas with the use of the word "assassin," which was not then in the Dutch language, but common in French and English, was better understood.

The ordinary meaning of this word "assassin," as used in military parlance at this time, was not that of a dastardly or prowling murderer, but rather that of a soldier who attacks suddenly without warning; and this seems to have been the method of the impetuous, young George Washington, in July 1754, when he rushed upon the French party, during which Jumonville was killed.

Van Braam later joined the 60th Foot (The Royal American Regiment) and fought in the American Revolutionary War, serving on the British side. In a letter to Washington, he expressed personal regret at the change of relations and the fortune of war. He resigned his commission in 1779. He then settled in France. He died in Charleville, Champagne, France on 7 August 1792.
