= Battle of Grand Pré =

Battle in Grand Pré during King George's War

Coordinates: 45°06′04″N 64°18′26″W

Battle of Grand-Pré
- Part of King George's War
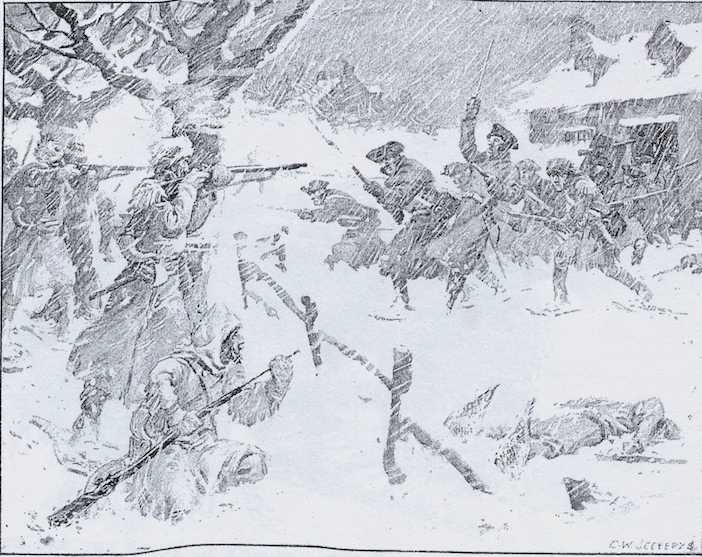
- Battle of Grand Pré by Charles William Jefferys
Date	10–11 February 1747
Location	Grand-Pré, Nova Scotia
Result	French victory

Belligerents
France; Mi'kmaq militia Acadia militia	New England Colonies

Commanders and leaders
Nicolas Antoine II Coulon de Villiers (French commander); Charles Deschamps de Boishébert et de Raffetot; Louis de la Corne, Chevalier de la Corne; Pierre Maillard	Arthur Noble †; Jedidiah Preble; Charles Morris; Benjamin Goldthwait; Edward How (POW); Erasmus James Philipps

Units involved
Acadian militia Wabanaki Confederacy (Mi'kmaq militia and Maliseet militia); Troupes de la marine	Gorham's Rangers

Strength
250–300	500

Casualties and losses
53 killed (Note: Morris estimated the French had lost 30 men but that the Acadians later "affirmed they saw buried by both parties' one hundred and twenty men". This would put the French losses at fifty-three.)	67 killed, 40 prisoner, 40 wounded

The Battle of Grand Pré, also known as the Battle of Minas and the Grand Pré Massacre, was a battle in the mid-18th century King George's War that took place between British colonial troops and Canadian, Mi'kmaq, and Acadian forces at present-day Grand-Pré, Nova Scotia in the winter of 1747 during the War of the Austrian Succession. (Note: The first reference to this battle as a massacre was in 1755 by William Douglass.) The New England forces were contained to Annapolis Royal and wanted to secure the head of the Bay of Fundy. Led by Nicolas Antoine II Coulon de Villiers and Louis de la Corne, Chevalier de la Corne under orders from Jean-Baptiste Nicolas Roch de Ramezay, the French forces surprised and defeated a force of Massachusetts provincials and rangers that were quartered in the village.

== Background ==
Grand Pré had been the staging ground for the French and Mi'kmaq sieges of Annapolis Royal in 1744 and 1745. As a result, New England Ranger John Gorham demanded to take control of Grand Pré after the first siege in 1744 and again after the second.

The French made another attempt at the capital in 1746 under the command of De Ramezay, who had to withdraw from the capital as a result of the failed Duc d'Anville expedition. De Ramezay retired to Beaubassin. (During this time period, Ramezay sent troops to British-occupied Port-La-Joye on present-day Prince Edward Island. In the ensuing battle, Ramezay's men killed 34 unarmed soldiers and sailors and captured 7 soldiers.

In response to the assaults on Annapolis Royal that were being staged at Grand Pré (and Chignecto), Governor Shirley sent Colonel Arthur Noble and hundreds of New England soldiers to secure control over Grand Pré. In early December 1746 a force of one hundred men under the command of Captain Charles Morris was sent to Grand Pré. These troops were eventually joined by troops under the command of Captains Jedidiah Preble and Benjamin Goldthwait, and Colonel Gorham's Rangers. Colonel Noble arrived by sea with an additional one hundred men in early January 1747. In all there were approximately five hundred New England troops stationed at Grand Pré. Initially the troops were billeted at Grand Pré and several communities nearby. Upon Noble's arrival he ordered the troops brought into Grand Pré where they were billeted in twenty-four houses that extended across the village for nearly two and a half miles. At this early stage some of the inhabitants at Grand Pré warned the New Englanders that "Messr. Ramezay had conceived some design" to attack them. The warning was ignored as the New Englanders felt it was "impracticable" to project such an attack that would mean a long march through deep snow and across "rivers being froze with ice floating up and down".

== Gallery ==
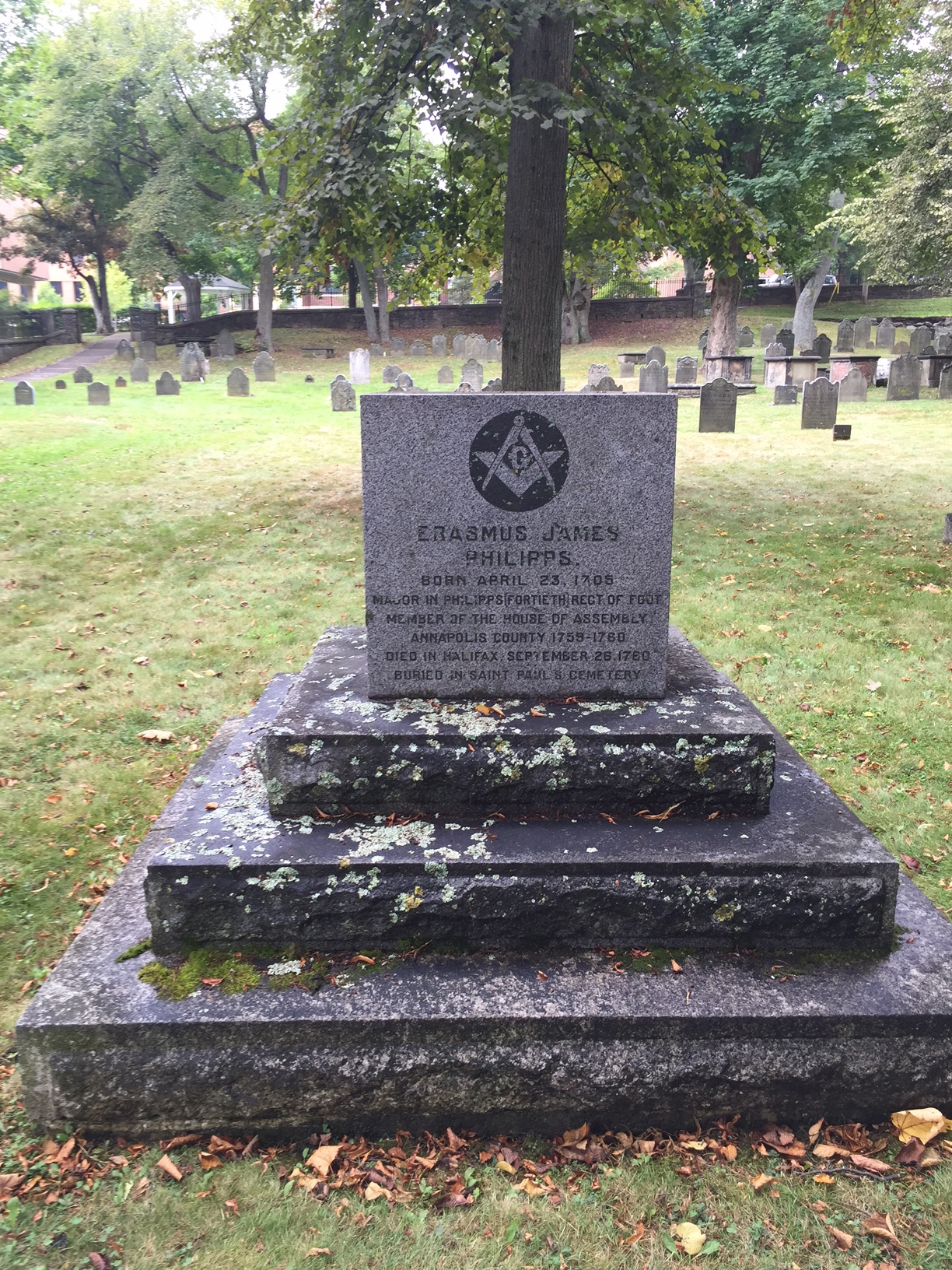
Erasmus James Philipps, Old Burying Ground (Halifax, Nova Scotia)

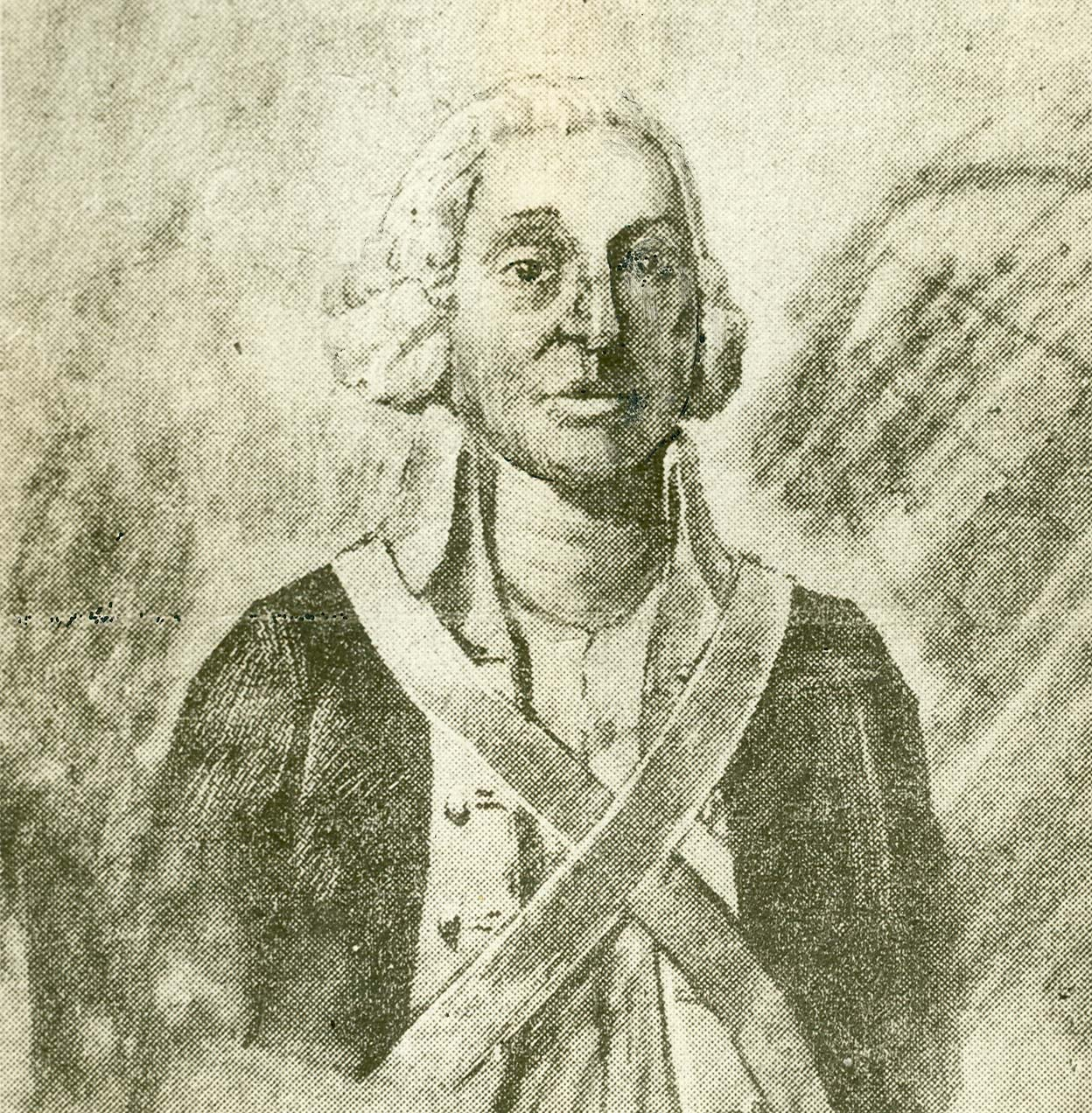
Captain Jedidiah Preble

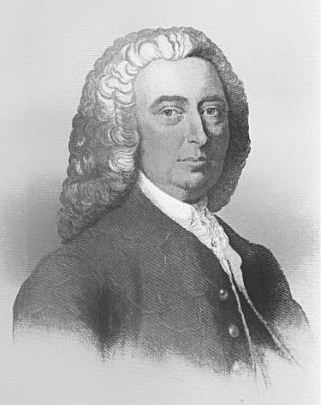
Col. Arthur Noble

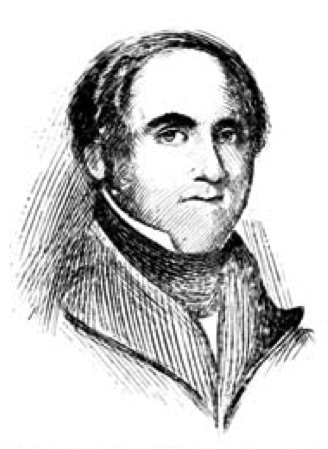
Captain Charles Morris

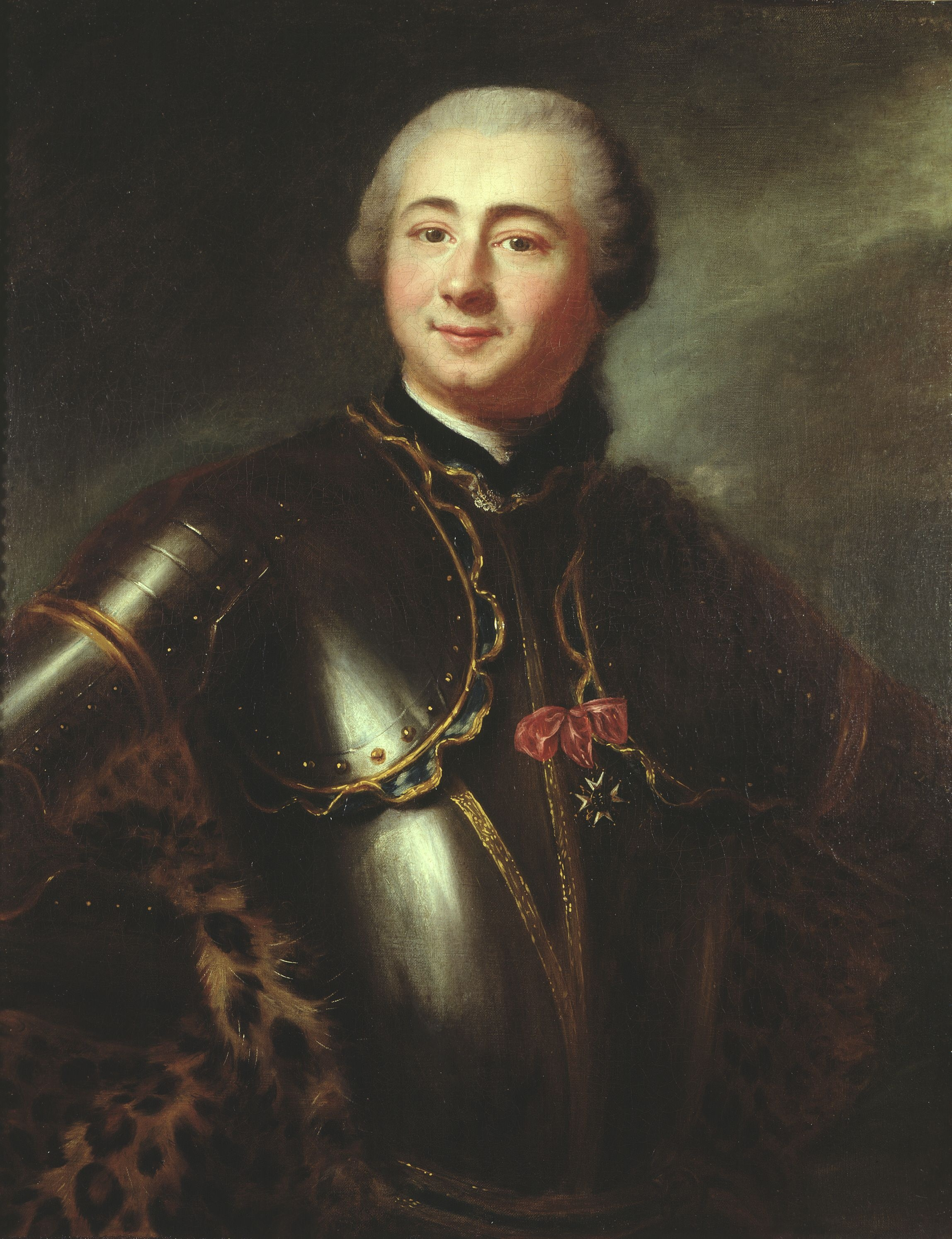
Charles Deschamps de Boishébert et de Raffetot

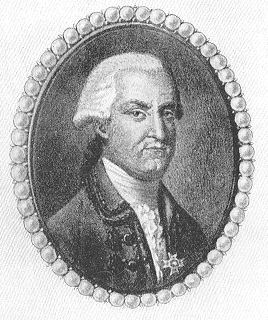
Louis de la Corne, Chevalier de la Corne

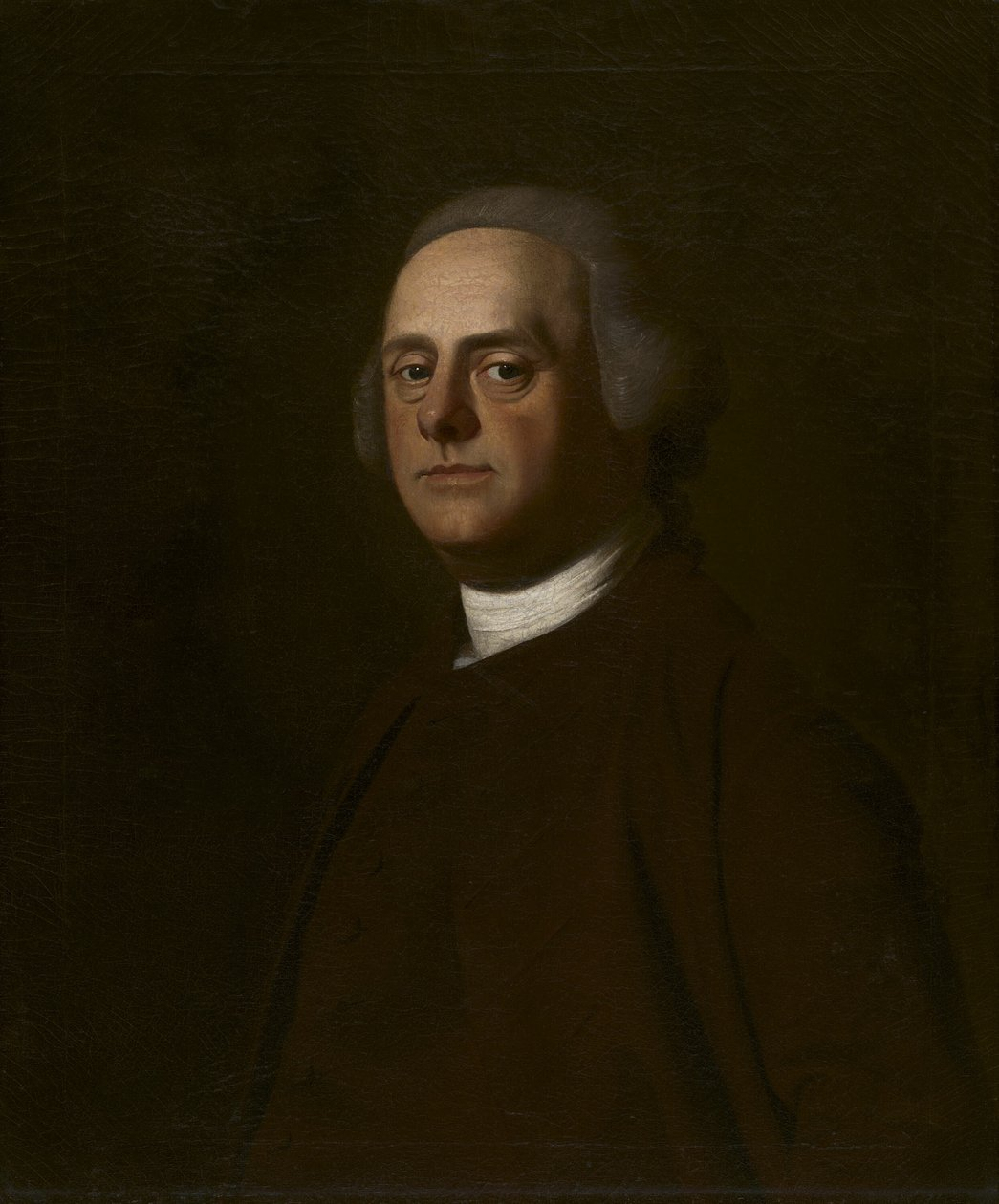
Joseph Gerrish

== Trek from Beaubassin ==
After the rigors of the previous year's campaign in Nova Scotia the Canadian "detachment was extraordinarily weakened by maladies" including De Ramezay and it was for this reason he delegated command of the attack to Captain Coulon de Villiers. (Note: Morris (1748) mentions several times that both the "French American Troops and Indians" were suffering from a "distemper", linking the illness to that which had devastated the sailors and soldiers of the D'Anville fleet.) On January 21, 1747 the French then commenced a 21-day winter march to the Minas. The troops, on snowshoes and utilizing sleds, crossed to Bay Verte, followed the Northumberland shore to Tatamagouche, crossed the Cobequid Mountains to Cobequid Bay near present-day Truro, and by February 2 had reached the Shubenacadie River where they found the river blocked by ice and too dangerous for the main force to cross. De Villiers ordered Boishébert to cross the river with ten men and "to block the roads of the inhabitants in this district to make sure we are not discovered." Throughout the trek the Canadian force was joined by both Acadian militia and Mi'kmaq warriors. Further assistance came when they were sheltered and fed by local Acadian families who also provided information on the New England positions. There were Acadians, however, that were not allies. At Cobequid (Truro), de Villiers took precaution "to block all the paths because the ill-intentioned inhabitants could undertake to pass and alert the English to our march."

With the lower Shubenacadie River blocked by ice, the main force travelled the eastern shore of the river until they passed the tidal reach and there crossed over to the western side. They quickly crossed overland to the Kennetcook River and then on to the Acadian village at Pisiguit where the villagers replenished their food supplies which had been running low for several days. By midday on February 10, despite a raging blizzard, the troops were on their final march, taking the old Acadian road over Horton Mountain to Melanson Village in the Gaspereau Valley, just a few miles from Grand Pré. At Melanson the troops were joined by Acadian guides who led them directly to the houses where the New Englanders were billeted.

== Battle ==
De Villiers' combined force of Canadians, Mi'kmaq and Acadians amounted to about five hundred men. (Note: Morris (1748) estimate) A French account states de Villiers left the Beaubassin area with two hundred and fifty Canadians and fifty Mi'kmaq. These troops, as previously mentioned, were further augmented by additional Mi'kmaq as well as Acadians. The French, on the night of February 10 in a blinding snowstorm and utilizing the element of surprise, attacked ten of the houses in which the New Englanders were billeted. Other than sentries, most of the New England soldiers were asleep.

The French were initially successful in the close-range fighting that followed. Noble was killed along with four other New England officers and the French took most of the houses killing over 60 New Englanders in fierce close-range fighting that also claimed the lives of many attackers. De Villiers' left arm was shattered almost immediately by a musket ball, a wound that would later lead to his death. (Note: In October, Coulon de Villiers went to France for treatment of his wound at a thermal spring. In 1748 he was awarded the cross of the Order of Saint-Louis with an 800-livre gratuity, and was appointed major of Trois-Rivières. After his return to Canada in 1749 he was obliged to have his wounded arm amputated. He did not survive the operation, and was buried at Montréal on 4 April 1750.) He was replaced by his second-in-command, La Corne.

The battle continued to rage across the village where the New Englanders managed to hold a few houses. The Canadians also attacked and captured the small fort at Hortonville and two British supply sloops moored in the Basin. Eventually the defending force rallied to concentrate their troops in a stronghold within a stone house in the center of the village which they held with 350 men and several small artillery pieces. The defenders made a sally from the stone house in the afternoon to try to recover their supply vessels but were unable to fight their way through deep snow drifts and were forced to retire to the stone house. The fighting continued until the next morning when a cease fire was arranged to end the stand-off as the French were unable to storm the stone house while the New Englanders were running out of ammunition and food. This truce stood throughout the day and the following morning the New Englanders agreed to capitulate under honourable terms. Captain Charles Morris reported sixty-seven New England troops killed, including their commander Col. Noble, along with upwards of forty taken prisoner, and forty more being wounded or sick. Morris estimated the French had lost 30 men but that the Acadians later "affirmed they saw buried by both parties one hundred and twenty men." This would put the French losses at fifty-three.

== Aftermath ==
After the cease-fire, both sides agreed to terms that allowed the New Englanders to return to Annapolis Royal. The 350 soldiers in the stone house were allowed to keep their arms and march back to Annapolis Royal while the French kept prisoners of war captured in the fighting as well as the two supply sloops. The New Englanders marched away with full honours of war as article 3 of the capitulation stated: "That the troops of his most Christian Majesty shall be drawn up in two ranks with rested firelocks and that the troops of his Britannic Majesty should march thro them with all the military Honours of War with drums beating and colours flying." The six-day march back through deep snow, unassisted by snowshoes, caused the New Englanders to suffer "extreme fatigues, excessive colds, and difficulties we laboured under through our men into violent fevers and fluxes at their return by which means we lost one hundred and fifty more." The French later retired from Grand-Pré, initially to Noel, Nova Scotia (in the Cobequid region), taking with them prisoners of war as well as both French and New England wounded. The more severely wounded were left under the care of the Acadians at Grand Pré. Some of the prisoners would be released to the New Englanders in the spring, while the others were sent to Québec and then to Boston.

The battle slowed the British advance to occupy the head of the Bay of Fundy. The New Englanders returned to Grand Pré shortly after, in March, 1747. They took possession of the stone house and required the Inhabitants to renew their "promise of a faithful obedience to the English Government." They also sailed to Pisiguit where they burned, while under fire by Acadians, a vessel the Canadian troops had used when they withdrew from Minas. The area remained embroiled in conflict during Father Le Loutre's War (see Siege of Grand Pre). British forces did not advance farther into the Fundy basin until three years later when, in the aftermath of the Battle at Chignecto and the aftermath of the war in general, the British Army built Fort Lawrence. Both Nicolas Antoine II Coulon de Villiers and Louis de la Corne, Chevalier de la Corne were awarded the Order of Saint Louis from the King of France for their participation in the battle.

== Commemorations ==
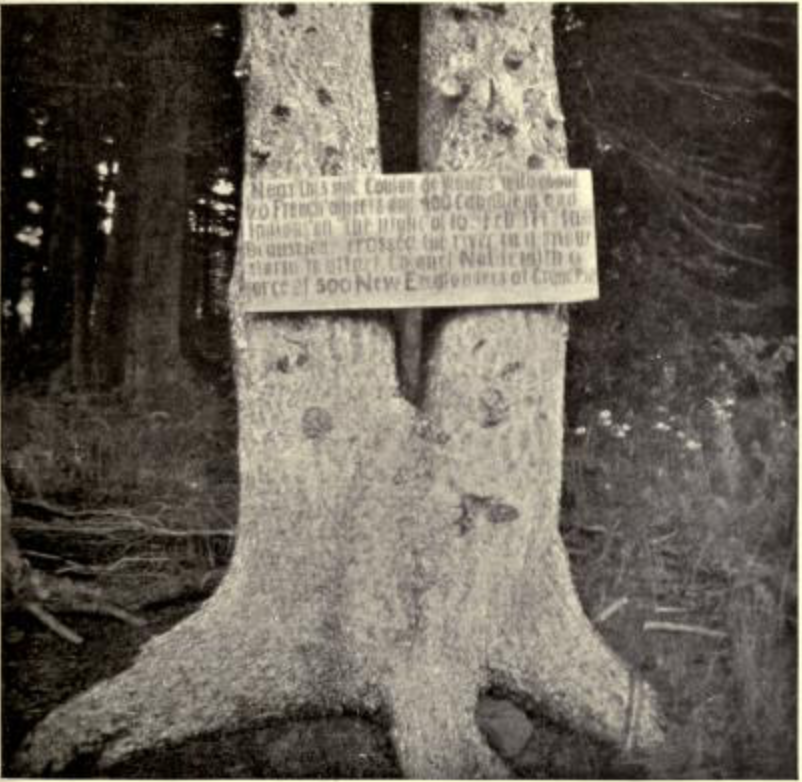
Original sign to mark location of Battle of Grand Pre (1911)

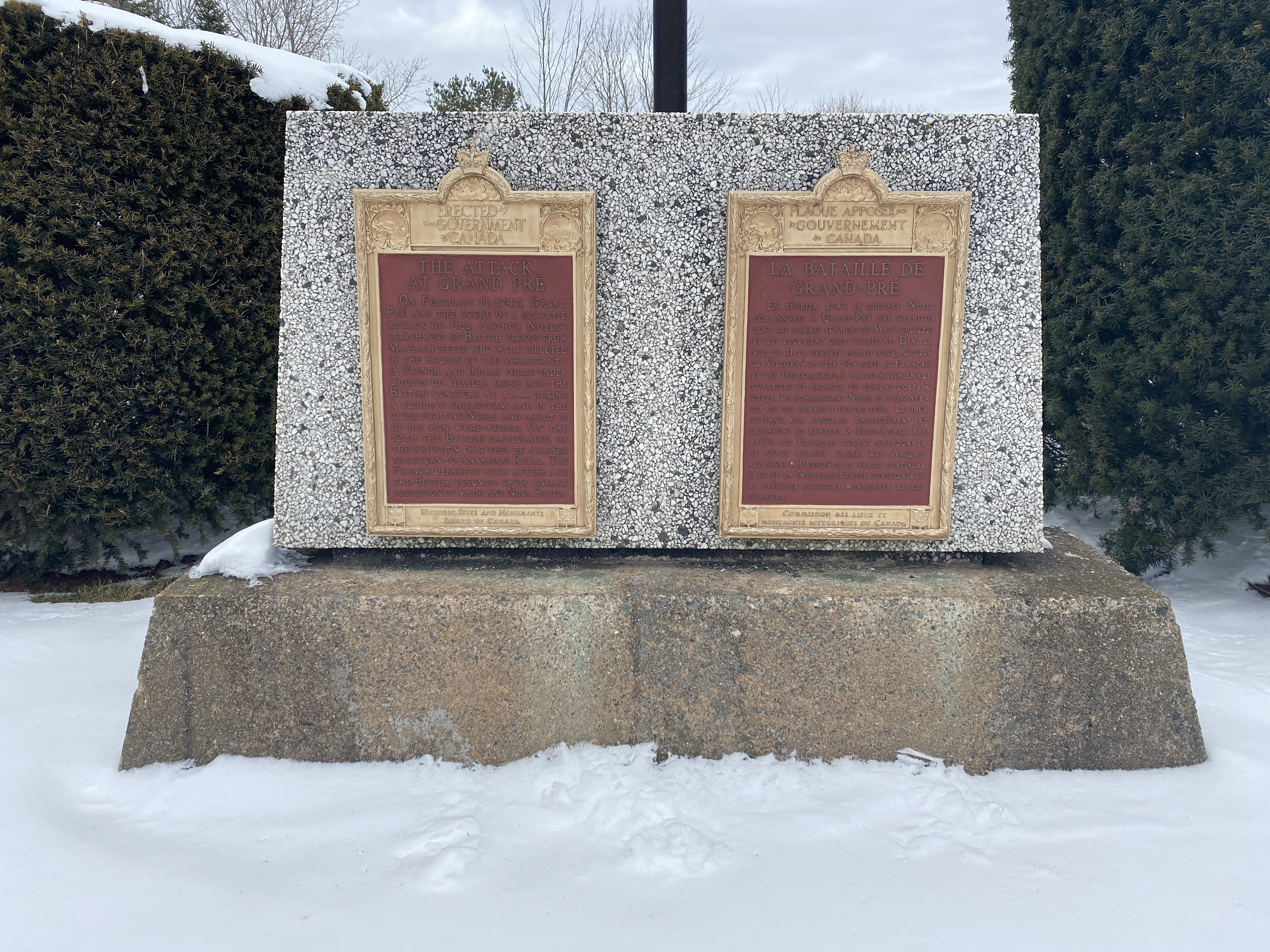
Plaque by National Historic Sites of Canada, Attack at Grand Pre, Nova Scotia (1938)

The location of the battle was designated by the Historic Sites and Monuments Board of Canada in 1924 and marked by a plaque in 1938.

A number of authors have explored the battle in literature. The historian and poet Mary Jane Katzmann Lawson wrote the poem "The Battle of Grand Pre" about 1820 Merrill Denison who wrote a radio play "The Raid on Grand Pre" in 1931 and Archibald MacMechan wrote a book "Red Snow on Grand Pré" in the same year.

One of the Acadians who accompanied the French on this expedition was Zedore Gould then aged 20, who afterwards escaping the Expulsion was a tenant to DesBarres on his Minudie estate. He lived to a great age and was fond of relating his experiences in this, perhaps the most famous exploit in Nova Scotian History.

== See also ==
- Military history of Nova Scotia
- List of massacres in Canada
