= Battle of Jumonville Glen =

Opening battle of the French and Indian War

- Part of the French and Indian War
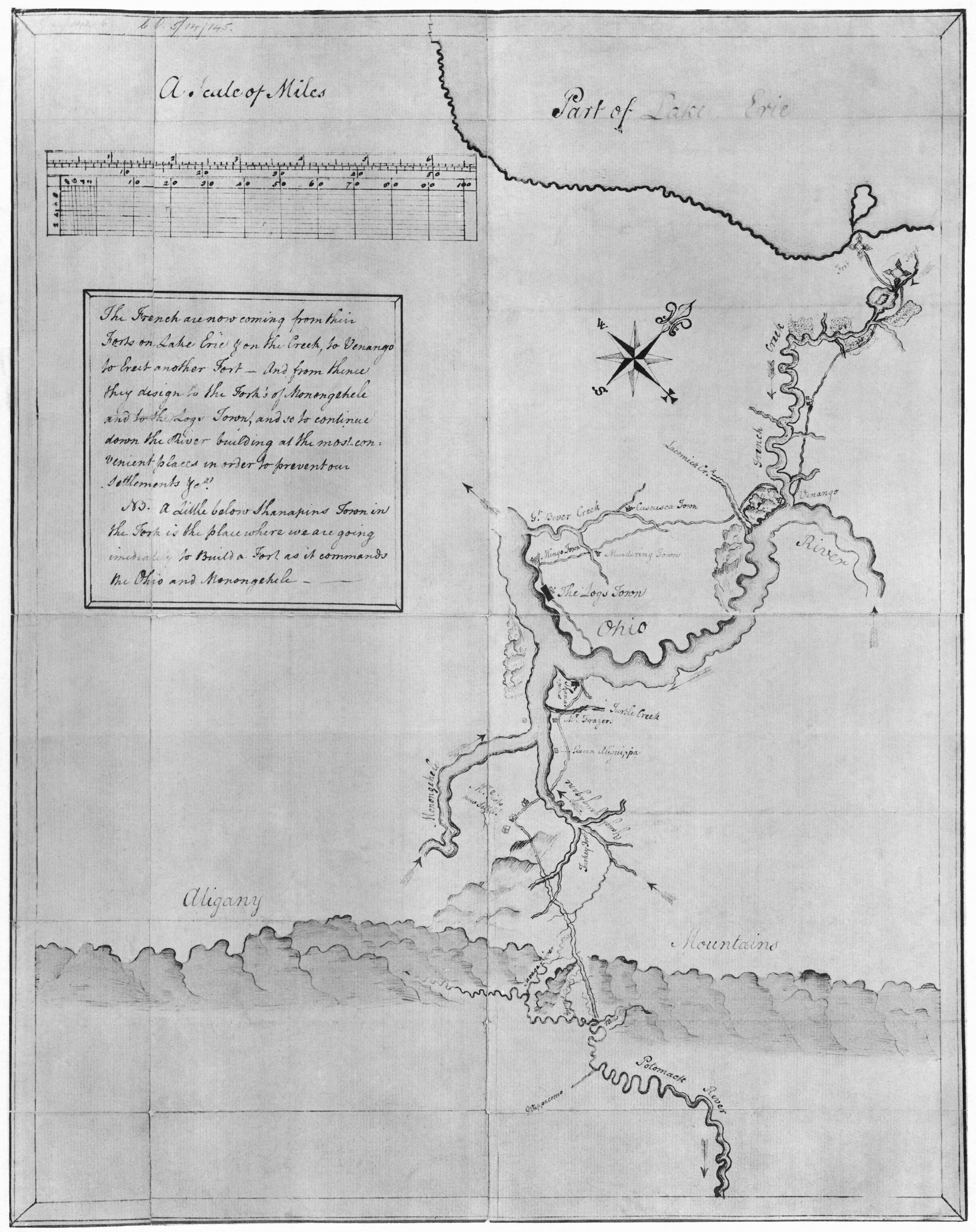
- Washington's map of the Ohio River and surrounding region containing notes on French intentions, 1753 or 1754
Date	May 28, 1754
Location	Between present-day Hopwood and Farmington, Pennsylvania 39°52′46″N 79°38′44″W
Result	British victory: Beginning of the French and Indian War

Belligerents
Great Britain; British America; Mingo	France; New France

Commanders and leaders
George Washington; Tanacharison	(New France) Joseph Coulon de Jumonville †

Strength
40 provincials; 12 Indians	35 regulars

Casualties and losses
1 killed; 2–3 wounded	Reports vary; most were captured or killed
- Location within Pennsylvania

The Battle of Jumonville Glen, also known as the Jumonville affair, was the opening battle of the French and Indian War, fought on May 28, 1754, near present-day Hopwood and Uniontown in Fayette County, Pennsylvania. A company of provincial troops from Virginia under the command of Lieutenant Colonel George Washington, and a small number of Mingo warriors led by the chieftain Tanacharison (also known as the "Half King"), ambushed a force of 35 French Canadians under the command of Joseph Coulon de Jumonville.

A larger French Canadian force had driven off a small crew attempting to construct Fort Prince George under the auspices of the Ohio Company at present-day Pittsburgh, Pennsylvania, land claimed by the French. A British colonial force led by George Washington was sent to protect the fort under construction. The French Canadians sent Jumonville to warn Washington about encroaching on French-claimed territory. Washington was alerted to Jumonville's presence by Tanacharison, and they joined forces to ambush the French Canadian camp. Washington's force killed Jumonville and some of his men in the ambush and captured most of the others. The exact circumstances of Jumonville's death are a subject of historical controversy and debate.

Since Britain and France were not then at war, the event had international repercussions, and was a contributing factor in the start of the Seven Years' War in 1756, also known as the French and Indian War in the United States. After the action, Washington retreated to Fort Necessity, where Canadian forces from Fort Duquesne compelled his surrender. The terms of Washington's surrender included a statement (written in French, a language that Washington did not read) that admitted that Jumonville was assassinated. That document and others were used by the French and the Canadians to level accusations that Washington had ordered Jumonville's slaying.

== Background ==
Throughout the 1740s and early 1750s, British and French Canadian traders had increasingly come into contact in the Ohio Country, including the upper watershed of the Ohio River in what is now western Pennsylvania. Authorities in New France became more aggressive in their efforts to expel British traders and colonists from the area and in 1753 began construction of a series of fortifications in the area.

The French action drew the attention of not only the British but also the Indian tribes of the area. Despite good Franco-Indian relations, British traders had become highly successful in convincing the Indians to trade with them in preference to the Canadians, and the planned large-scale advance was not well received by all. In particular, Tanacharison, a Mingo chief also known as the "Half King," became decidedly anti-French as a consequence. In a meeting with Paul Marin de la Malgue, commander of the French and Canadian construction force, de la Malgue reportedly lost his temper, and shouted at the Indian chief, "I tell you, down the river I will go. If the river is blocked up, I have the forces to burst it open and tread under my feet all that oppose me. I despise all the stupid things you have said." He then threw down some wampum that Tanacharison had offered as a goodwill gesture. Marin died not long after, when command of the operations was turned over to Jacques Legardeur de Saint-Pierre.

Virginia Royal Governor Robert Dinwiddie sent Major George Washington to the Ohio Country (a territory that was claimed by several of the British colonies, including Virginia) as an emissary in December 1753 to tell the French to leave. Saint-Pierre politely informed Washington that he was there pursuant to orders, that Washington's letter should have been addressed to his commanding officer in Canada and that he had no intention of leaving.

Washington returned to Williamsburg and informed Governor Dinwiddie that the French refused to leave. Dinwiddie commissioned Washington a lieutenant colonel, and ordered him to begin raising a provincial regiment to hold the Forks of the Ohio, a site Washington had identified as a fine location for a fortress. The Governor also issued a captain's commission to Ohio Company employee William Trent, with instructions to raise a small force and immediately begin construction of the fort. Dinwiddie issued these instructions on his own authority, without even asking for funding from the Virginia House of Burgesses until after the fact. Trent's company arrived on site in February 1754, and began construction of a storehouse and stockade with the assistance of Tanacharison and the Mingos. The same month, an 800-strong French Canadian militia, as well as French troupes de la marine, departed Montreal for the Ohio River Valley under the command of Claude-Pierre Pécaudy de Contrecœur, a Canadian who took over command from Saint-Pierre. When Contrecœur learned of Trent's activity, he led a force of about 500 men (consisting of troupes de la marine, militia, and Indians) to drive them off (rumors reaching Trent's men put its size at 1,000). On April 16, Contrecœur's force arrived at the forks. The next day, Trent's force of 36 men, led by Ensign Edward Ward in Trent's absence, agreed to leave the site. The French then began construction of the fort they called "Fort Duquesne".

== Prelude ==
In March 1754, Dinwiddie ordered Washington back to the frontier with instructions to "act on the [defensive], but in Case any Attempts are made to obstruct the Works or interrupt our [settlements] by any Persons whatsoever, You are to restrain all such Offenders, & in Case of resistance to make Prisoners of or kill & destroy them". Historian Fred Anderson describes Dinwiddie's instructions, which were issued without the knowledge or direction of the British government in London, as "an invitation to start a war". Washington was ordered to gather up as many supplies and provincial troops as he could along the way. By the time he left for the frontier on April 2, he had recruited fewer than 160 men.

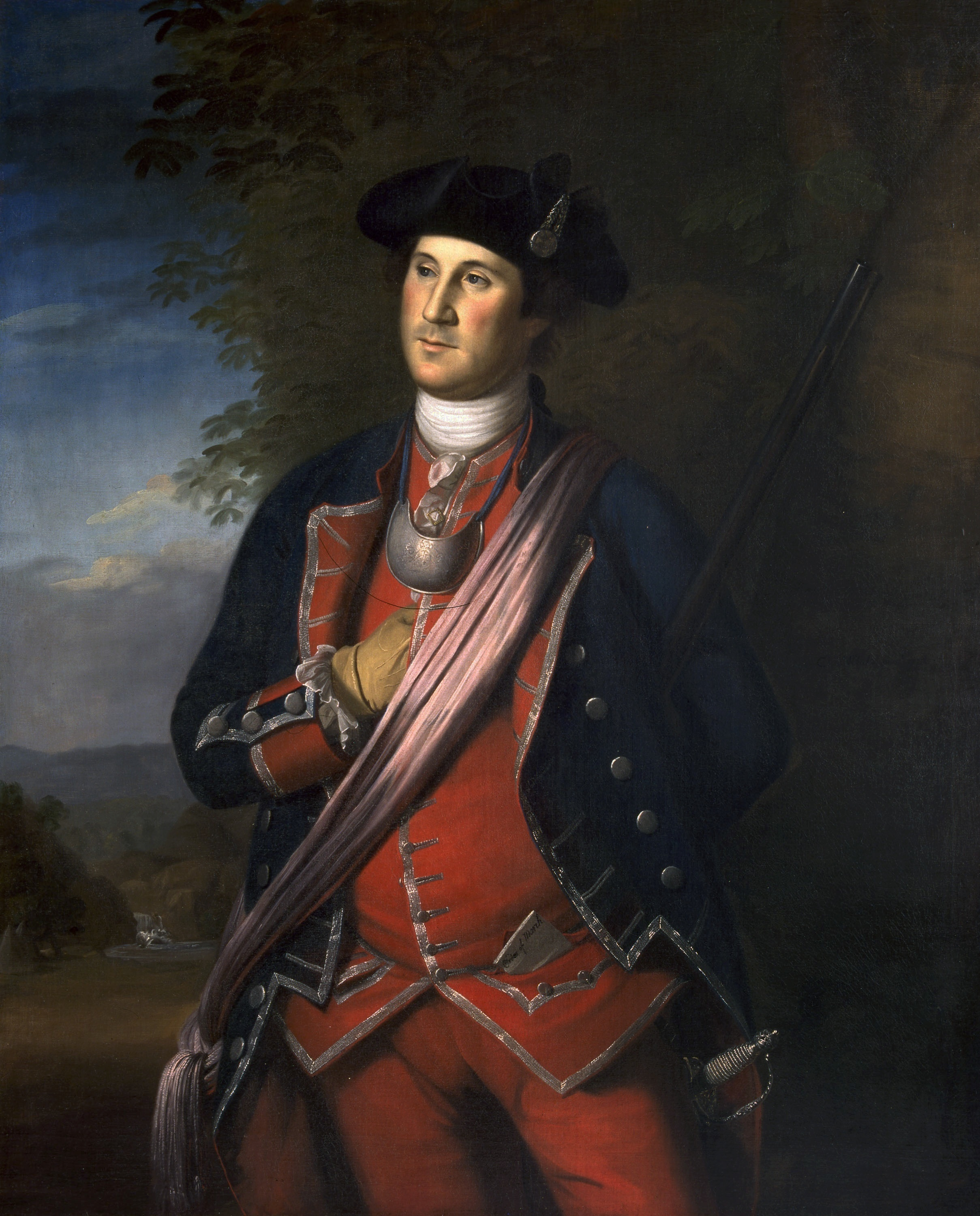
Portrait of George Washington by Charles Willson Peale, 1772

Along their march through the forests of the frontier, Washington was joined by more men at Winchester. He then learned from Captain Trent of the French advance. Trent also brought a message from Tanacharison, who promised warriors to assist the British. To keep Tanacharison's support, Washington decided not to turn back, choosing instead to advance. He reached a place known as the Great Meadows (now in Fayette County, Pennsylvania), about 37 miles (60 km) south of the forks, began to construct a small fort and awaited further news or instructions.

Contrecœur operated under orders that forbade attacks by his force unless they were provoked. On May 23, he sent Joseph Coulon de Villiers de Jumonville with 35 soldiers (principally French Canadian recruits) to see if Washington had entered French territory and with a summons to order Washington's troops out. The summons was similar in nature to the one that Washington had delivered to them four months earlier.

On May 27, Washington was informed by Christopher Gist, a settler who had accompanied him on the 1753 expedition, that a French Canadian party numbering about 50 was in the area. In response, Washington sent 75 men with Gist to find them. That evening, Washington received a message from Tanacharison, informing him that he had found the Canadian camp, and that the two of them should meet. Despite the fact that he had just sent another group in pursuit of the French Canadians, Washington went with a detachment of 40 men to meet with Tanacharison. The Mingo leader had with him 12 warriors, two of whom were boys. After discussing the matter, both leaders agreed to make an attack on the Canadians. The attackers took up positions behind rocks around the Canadian camp, counting not more than 40 Canadians.

== Battle ==
Exactly what happened next has been a subject of controversy and debate. The few primary accounts of the affair agree on a number of facts and disagree on others. They agree that the battle lasted about 15 minutes, that Jumonville was killed, and that most of his party were either killed or taken prisoner. According to French Canadian records, most of the dead were French Canadians: Desroussel and Caron from Québec City, Charles Bois from Pointe-Claire, Jérôme from La Prairie, L'Enfant from Montréal, Paris from Mille-Isles, Languedoc and Martin from Boucherville, and LaBatterie from Trois-Rivières.

Washington's accounts of the battle exist in several versions; they are consistent with one another, but the details are compressed, according to historian Fred Anderson, with the intent to obscure post-battle atrocities. Washington wrote in his diary, "We were advanced pretty near to them ... when they discovered us; whereupon I ordered my company to fire ... [Wagonner's] Company ... received the whole Fire of the French, during the greatest Part of the Action, which only lasted a Quarter of an Hour, before the Enemy was routed. We killed Mr. de Jumonville, the commander ... also nine others; we wounded one, and made Twenty-one Prisoners".

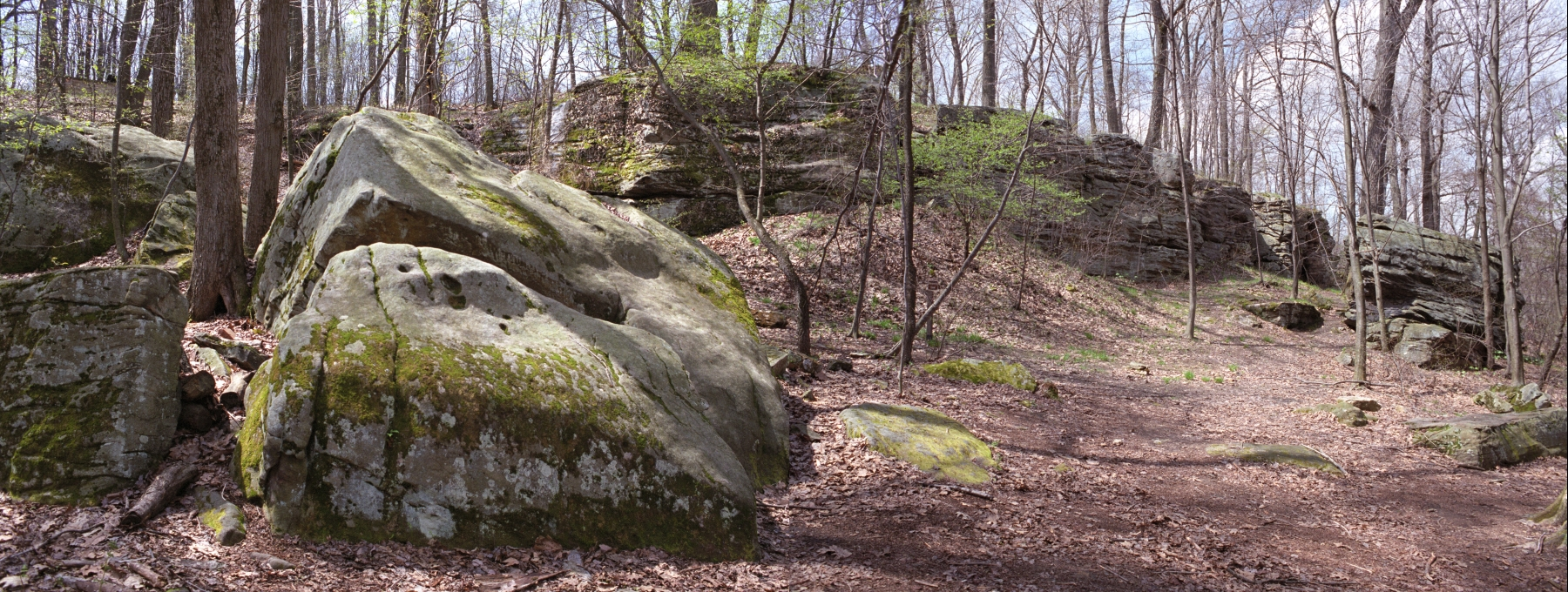
A 2007 photograph of the battle site

Contrecœur prepared an official report of the action that was based on two sources. Most of it came from a Canadian named Monceau, who escaped the action but apparently did not witness Jumonville's slaying:

[Jumonville's party] saw themselves surrounded by the English on one side and the Indians on the Other. The English gave them two volleys, but the Indians did not fire. Mr. de Jumonville, by his interpreter, told them to desist, that he had something to tell them. Upon which they ceased firing. Then Mr. de Jumonville ordered the Summons which I had sent them to retire, to be read ... Monceau saw all our Frenchmen coming up close to Mr. de Jumonville, whilst they were reading the Summons ... during which Time, said Monceau made the best of his Way to us".

Contrecœur's second source was an Indian from Tanacharison's camp, who reported that "Mr. de Jumonville was killed by a Musket-Shot in the Head, whilst they were reading the Summons". The same Indian claimed that the Indians then rushed in to prevent Washington's men from slaughtering the Frenchmen.

A third account was made by a private named John Shaw, who was in Washington's regiment but not present at the affair. His account, based on detailed accounts from others who were present, was made in a sworn statement on August 21; the details on Tanacharison's role in the affair are confirmed in a newspaper account printed on June 27. In his account, the French were surrounded while some still slept. Alerted by a noise, one of the Frenchmen

fired a Gun upon which Col. Washington gave the Word for all his Men to fire. Several of them being killed, the rest betook themselves to flight, but our Indians haveing gone round the French ... they fled back to the English and delivered up their Arms ... Some Time after[,] the Indians came up[,] the Half King took his Tomahawk and split the Head of the French Captain haveing first asked if he was an Englishman and haveing been told he was a French Man. He then took his Brains and washed his Hands with them and then scalped him. All this ... [Shaw] has heard and never heard it contradicted but knows nothing of it from his own Knowledge".

Shaw's narrative is substantially correct on a number of other details, including the size and composition of both forces. Shaw also claimed to have seen and counted the dead, numbering 13 or 14.

Anderson documents a fourth account by a Virginian deserter, named Denis Kaninguen, and speculates that Kaninguen was one of Tanacharison's followers. His report to the French commanders echoed that of Shaw: "notwithstanding the discharge of musket fire that [Washington] had made upon him, he [Washington] intended to read [the summons] and had withdrawn himself to his people, whom he had [previously] ordered to fire upon the French. That [Tanacharison], a savage, came up to [the wounded Jumonville] and had said, 'Tu n'es pas encore mort, mon père! ' [Thou art not yet dead, my father!] and struck several hatchet blows with which he killed him." Anderson notes that Kaninguen apparently understood what Tanacharison said, and understood it to be a ritual slaying. Kaninguen reported that 30 men were taken prisoner, and 10 to 12 had been killed. The Virginians suffered only one killed and two or three wounded.

== Aftermath ==
Washington wrote a letter to his brother after the battle in which he said "I can with truth assure you, I heard bullets whistle and believe me, there was something charming in the sound." Following the battle, Washington returned to the Great Meadows and pushed onward the construction of a fort, which was called Fort Necessity. The dead were left on the field or buried in shallow graves, where they were later found by the French.

On June 28, 1754, a combined force of 600 French, French Canadian, and Indian soldiers, under the command of Jumonville's brother, Louis Coulon de Villiers, left Fort Duquesne. On July 3, they captured Fort Necessity in the Battle of Fort Necessity and forced Washington to negotiate a withdrawal under arms. The capitulation document that Washington signed was written in French, which Washington did not know how to read, and it may have been poorly translated for him by a Dutchman who spoke neither English nor French well, and it included language claiming that Jumonville and his men had been assassinated. Surviving French officers captured at Jumonville Glen included Pierre-Jacques Drouillon de Macé, and two cadets, Michel-Ignace Dandonneau (Sieur du Sablé), and René Amable Boucher de Boucherville. They were removed to Virginia, ultimately being shipped to London by Dinwiddie, along with 19 of the militiamen, arriving on June 10, 1755. An exception was Michel Pépin, called "La Force", a skilled interpreter with whom Washington was previously acquainted. After the Battle of Fort Necessity, "La Force" was held hostage in Williamsburg, as Captains Robert Stobo and Jacob Van Braam had been taken as hostages by the French.

=== Escalation ===
When news of the two battles reached England in August, the government of the Duke of Newcastle, after several months of negotiations, sent an army expedition the following year to dislodge the French. Major General Edward Braddock was chosen to lead the expedition. He was defeated at the Battle of the Monongahela, and the French remained in control of Fort Duquesne until 1758, when an expedition under General John Forbes finally succeeded in taking the fort.

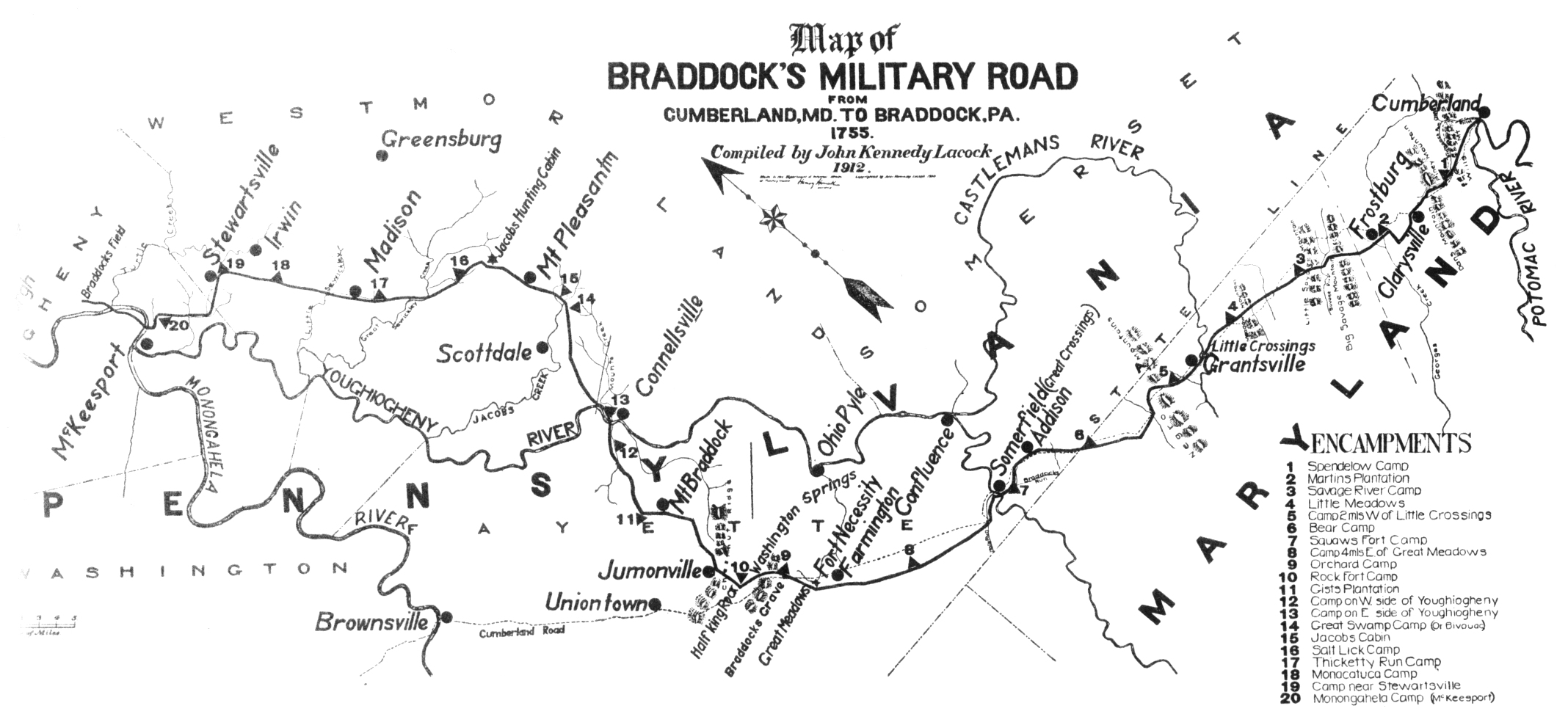
A 1912 map showing the route of the Braddock expedition

Word of the British military plans had leaked to France well before Braddock's departure for North America, and King Louis XV dispatched a much larger body of troops to Canada in 1755. Although they arrived too late to participate in Braddock's defeat, the French troop presence led to a string of French victories in the following years. Royal Navy Admiral Edward Boscawen led a small squadron of ships which attacked the French ship Alcide in a naval action on June 8, 1755, capturing her and two troopships transporting some of those soldiers to North America. Military actions continued on soil and at sea in North America until France and Great Britain declared war on each other in spring 1756. That marked the formal start of the Seven Years' War.

== Propaganda and analysis ==
Because of the inconsistent nature of the record of the action, contemporary and historical coverage of it has been easily colored by preferences for one account over another. Francis Parkman, for example, accepted Washington's account and was highly dismissive of the accounts by Monceau and the Indian.

French authorities assembled a dossier of documents to counter British accounts of the affair. Entitled "Mémoire contenant le précis des faits, avec leurs pièces justificatives, pour servir de réponse aux 'Observations' envoyées par les Ministres d'Angleterre, dans les cours de l'Europe", a copy was intercepted in 1756, translated, and published as "A memorial containing a summary view of facts, with their authorities, in answer to observations sent by the English ministry to the courts of Europe". It used Washington's capitulation statement and other documents, including extracts of Washington's journal taken at Fort Necessity, to suggest that Washington had actually ordered the assassination of Jumonville. However, not all Frenchmen agreed with the story: the Chevalier de Lévis called it a "so-called assassination". The French story contrasted with that of the British account. Based on Washington's report, the British suggested that Jumonville, rather than being engaged on a diplomatic mission, was spying on them. Jumonville's orders included specific instructions to notify Contrecœur if the summons was read so that additional forces might be sent if needed.

Historian Fred Anderson theorizes about the reasons for Tanacharison's action in the killing and provides a possible explanation for one of Tanacharison's men reporting the event as a British killing of a Frenchman. Tanacharison had lost influence over some of the local tribes (specifically the Delawares) and may have thought that conflict between the British and French would bring them back under his influence as allies of the British. According to Parkman, after the Indians scalped the French, they sent a scalp to the Delawares and in essence offered them the opportunity to "take up the hatchet" with the British and against the French.

== Legacy ==
A portion of the battlefield, along with the Great Meadows, where Fort Necessity was located, has been preserved as a part of Fort Necessity National Battlefield. Jumonville's name has been given to a Christian retreat center near the site. The non-profit Braddock Road Preservation Association, named for the road General Braddock constructed to reach Fort Duquesne, sponsors research and promotes the French and Indian War history of the area.
