= Joseph Coulon de Jumonville =

French Canadian military officer (1718–1754)

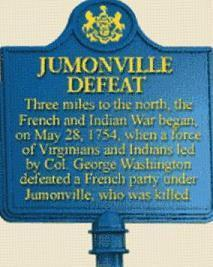
Historical marker describing the death of Jumonville

Joseph Coulon de Villiers, Sieur de Jumonville (September 8, 1718 – May 28, 1754) was a French Canadian military officer. His last rank was second ensign (enseigne en second). Jumonville's defeat and killing at the Battle of Jumonville Glen by forces led by George Washington was one of the sparks that ignited the Seven Years' War, also known as the French and Indian War in the United States.

== Early life ==
Jumonville was born in the seigneury of Verchères, New France (now part of Quebec), the son of Nicolas-Antoine Coulon de Villiers, a French military officer. He began service with the French military at age 15, in his father's unit.

He served in the army during several conflicts with native groups in the western Great Lakes region where he was stationed with his father and several of his brothers. His father and one of his brothers were killed at Baie-des-Puants (present Green Bay, Wisconsin) in 1733 during a battle with the Fox tribe. In 1739, he served in Governor Bienville's abortive expedition against the Chickasaw nation. He was later promoted to Second Ensign and stationed in Acadia during King George's War (as the North American theater of the War of the Austrian Succession is sometimes called). In 1745 he married Marie-Anne-Marguerite Soumande of Montreal.

== Battle of Jumonville Glen ==
In June 1754, Jumonville was posted to Fort Duquesne with his older half-brother, Louis Coulon de Villiers. The French were building up military strength, much of it Native American recruitment (Note: The editors of the American Book of Indians point out: "Some, maybe many, escaped from the long nightmare to the intact tribes beyond the [colonies'] borders; the Narraganset went to Maine and turn [into] Abnaki by the hundreds, maybe thousands, after King Philip's War; and the parade of Tuscarora plodding north to [join] the Iroquois took 100 years to pass. But one after the other of the intact tribes marched to destruction in their turn in the major colonial wars from 1689 to 1763, echoes for the most part of European wars between France and England, but in America, fought on the American plan, with as much use as possible of Indian allies." As covered elsewhere in the work, the date range is really from before the 1610s (i.e. First Contacts—Champlain made mortal enemies of the Haudenosaunee in 1608 aiding a Huron and Algonkian war party against the Mohawk nation.) for many years, colonial governments in New England and Virginia went to war alongside Indian war parties, lending their allied tribes use of firearms or military forces while Indians settled old scores with rival tribes. The encyclopedia also points out such wars before rarely resulted in great loss of life and wholesale displacement of women and children or destruction of crops and villages theretofore, but white contact and firepower created a cultural shift; instead of a resolution under smoking a peace-pipe setting terms of a subjugation and tributes from a defeated tribe, now North America seethed under a succession of blood baths that often included genocide as events escalated into wars of revenge, with each round giving more cause for revenge for the next, the whole process leading to wars of conquest and extermination, rippling westwards ahead of white-versus-Indian frontier conflicts as a separate frontier preceding the later migration of Europeans.) in the disputed territory of the Ohio Country in response to an increasing presence by British American traders and settlers. (Note: After the end of the French and Indian War, the British Crown acted repressively to prevent most trans-Allegheny settlement, including arresting pioneers and forcibly returning families back to the east. The very passage of the act was a causus belli among the colonies' less propertied classes, and many considered the act a betrayal, as opposed to the service or support they'd provided to the British Crown during the war just ended.)

On May 23, 1754, Jumonville took command of a 35-man detachment from the fort and headed southeast. The exact nature of Jumonville's mission has been the subject of considerable debate, both at the time and up to the present day. Officially, his mission was to scout the area south of the fort. The French would later claim that he was a diplomat on a peaceful mission to deliver a message to the British. The British contended that he was sent to spy on their garrison at Fort Necessity and their road-building project. Tanacharison, known as the Half King and the leader of a band of new (Note: During the so called Beaver Wars, internecine wars for territory and displacement, unusual in character theretofore in Indian cultures, developed as Amerindian tribes realized they could acquire firearms for Beaver pelts. Multiple tribes fell during the many decades of near continual war, including five culturally related Iroquoian peoples to the Five Nations of the Haudenosaunee, who did most of the final conquering. The Iroquoian religious beliefs created a strong pattern of adopting conquered tribal members into their own nations, so many Susquehannock, Erie, Werno, Neutral or Tabacco peoples finished the eighteenth century as part of the economic and military might of the Haudenosaunee. In the next 7 to 8 decades, many remnants of these tribes drifted to the nearly empty lands of present-day western Pennsylvania and eastern Ohio where surviving groups joined with bands of Seneca, creating the new Mingo people.) Iroquoian peoples allied to the British, the Mingos, believed he was planning an ambush.

On May 27, 1754, a group of Native American scouts discovered Jumonville's party camped in a small valley (later called Jumonville Glen) near what is now Uniontown, Pennsylvania. Half King went to Washington and pleaded with him to attack the French encampment, claiming it was a hostile party sent to ambush them.

Washington took a detachment of about 40 men and marched all night in a driving rain, arriving at the encampment at dawn. What happened next, like so much about the incident, is a matter of controversy. The British claimed the French discovered their approach and opened fire on them. The French claimed the British ambushed their encampment. In either event, the battle lasted little more than 15 minutes and was a complete British victory. Ten French soldiers were killed and 21 captured, including the wounded Jumonville.

Washington treated Jumonville as a prisoner of war and extended him the customary courtesies due to a captured military officer. Washington attempted to interrogate Jumonville but the language barrier made communication difficult. During their conversation, however, the Half King walked up to Jumonville and, without warning, struck him in the head with a tomahawk, killing him.

Why the Half King did this has never been clear. He had been kidnapped by the French and sold into slavery as a child. He claimed that the French had boiled and eaten his father. He was also a representative of the Haudenosaunee Confederacy, which stood to lose its authority over other Indian peoples in the Ohio River Valley if the French were able to assert their control.

Other accounts state that Jumonville was not, in fact, captured but was one of the first killed by Washington's expeditionary forces. Adam Stephen, a military officer who had accompanied Washington to the scene, stated that Jumonville "was killed the first fire." No reference was made to Jumonville's having been captured and unsuccessfully interrogated by Washington. Also, it is unclear as to whether Jumonville was dispatched by bullet or tomahawk. In his footnotes added to Washington's journal in 1893, J.M. Toner stated that Half-King "was credited in certain quarters with having slain that officer [Jumonville] with his hatchet; but this was without any foundation in fact."

When word reached Fort Duquesne about the incident, Jumonville's half brother, Captain Coulon de Villiers, vowed revenge. He attacked Washington and the garrison at Fort Necessity and forced them to surrender on July 3, 1754. In the surrender document, written in French, Coulon de Villiers inserted a clause describing Jumonville's death as an "assassination".

Washington was heavily criticized in Britain for the incident. British statesman Horace Walpole referred to the controversy surrounding Jumonville's death as the "Jumonville Affair" and described it as "a volley fired by a young Virginian in the backwoods of America that set the world on fire."

== Jumonville's legacy ==
Jumonville's legacy was to resonate significantly throughout the Seven Years' War in the French national consciousness. As noted above, within a month of Jumonville's death, his older half-brother, Captain Coulon de Villiers, marched on Fort Necessity on 3 July and forced Washington to surrender. The parley between Washington and de Villiers was to be conducted in French, given that they were the victors. However, Fowler's research of the accounts of the engagement from Washington and his men reveal that only two of Washington's company spoke French: William La Peyronie and Jacob Van Braam. As such, La Peyronie and Van Braam were instructed to negotiate with Villiers, but La Peyronie had been seriously wounded in the initial engagement. Consequently, the terms were left to Van Braam to resolve. Braam, a former lieutenant in the Dutch army and a teacher of French in Virginia, alongside a captain in the Virginia Regiment, was Washington's de facto French and Dutch translator. That said, Van Braam's capability of translating French has been questioned in historiography given that it was not his first language. Ultimately, more research is required on Van Braam's own life to corroborate his capabilities as a translator. Regardless, Fowler has translated the terms Van Braam eventually agreed to after consulting Washington:

Capitulations granted by Mons. De Villier. Captain of infantry and commander of troops of his most Christian Majesty, to those English troops actually in the fort of Necessity, which was built on the King's lands of dominions on July 3rd, at 8 o'clock at night, 1754. As our intentions have never been to trouble the peace and good harmony which reigns between the two friendly princes, but only to revenge the assassination [emphasis added] which has been done on one of our officers, bearer of a summons, upon his party, as also to hinder any establishment on the lands of the dominions of the King, my master, upon these considerations, we are willing to grant protection or favour, to all the English that are in the said fort, upon the conditions hereafter mentioned.

Crucially, the terms Van Braam presented to Washington articulated that Jumonville had been an ambassador assassinated by Washington. The use of "assassinated" created a political pejorative that placed Washington and his men as the guilty party in the affair. Washington was only able to avoid a political scandal surrounding the Jumonville "assassination" affair by insisting he had not comprehended the text Van Braam had given to him, and even going so far as to accuse Van Braam of incompetence or duplicity.

The terms agreed to at Fort Necessity provided a nascent notion of Jumonville as an innocent Frenchman murdered by Washington and his men. Early research by Marcel Trudel and Donald Kent in the 1950s has demonstrated how the notion of Jumonville's killing being a murder gained currency in France, with Bishop de Pontbriand in a pastoral letter (1756) declaring:

You will all remember that when we captured Fort Necessity so gloriously, hostages were given to us, as well as a promise to return the prisoners taken in the action when Monsieur de Jumonville was killed contrary to international law and by a kind of assassination.

Trudel and Kent go on to demonstrate how pamphleteer Francois-Antoine Chevrier's 1758 mock-heroic poem 'L'Acadiade; Ou, Prouesses Angloises En Acadie, Canada and Antoine-Leonard Thomas' epic 1759 poem Jumonville further lamented Jumonville's death at the hands of Washington's men. These works were hyperbolic in nature and often stressed the innocence of Jumonville and played off nationalistic sentiment which incited nationalistic revenge, evident by the subject of Thomas' poem: "the assassination of Monsieur de Jumonville, and the vengeance for this murder." The underlining significance of these nationalistic sentiments has only recently been highlighted by David Bell's research in the early 2000s. Bell, in his analysis of Thomas' Jumonville, several engravings and illustrations of Jumonville's death, and Jesuit papers commenting on the affair, demonstrates how France seized the concept of international warfare to further nurture an embryonic sense of patriotism and nationalism among its subjects. It is in this sense how Jumonville's legacy is best understood: as a French martyr utilised by the French war literature to mobilise public opinion surrounding the nation. Indeed, the war-martyr as an emblematic symbol of the nation to promote national sentiment was a growing trend across Europe.

== See also ==
- Fort Necessity
- Jumonville (Pennsylvania), a camp and retreat center located in Fayette County
