= Braddock's Field =

Historic battlefield in Pennsylvania, US

- Location within Pittsburgh
- 40.40305°N 79.86337°W
- Location: 549 Jones Ave., Washington Statue Park, Braddock, Pennsylvania, U.S.

Braddock's Field is a historic battlefield on the banks of the Monongahela River, at Braddock, Pennsylvania, near the junction of Turtle Creek, about nine miles southeast of the "Forks of the Ohio" in Pittsburgh, Pennsylvania. In 1755, the Battle of the Monongahela was fought on Braddock's Field, which ended the Braddock Expedition.

== History ==
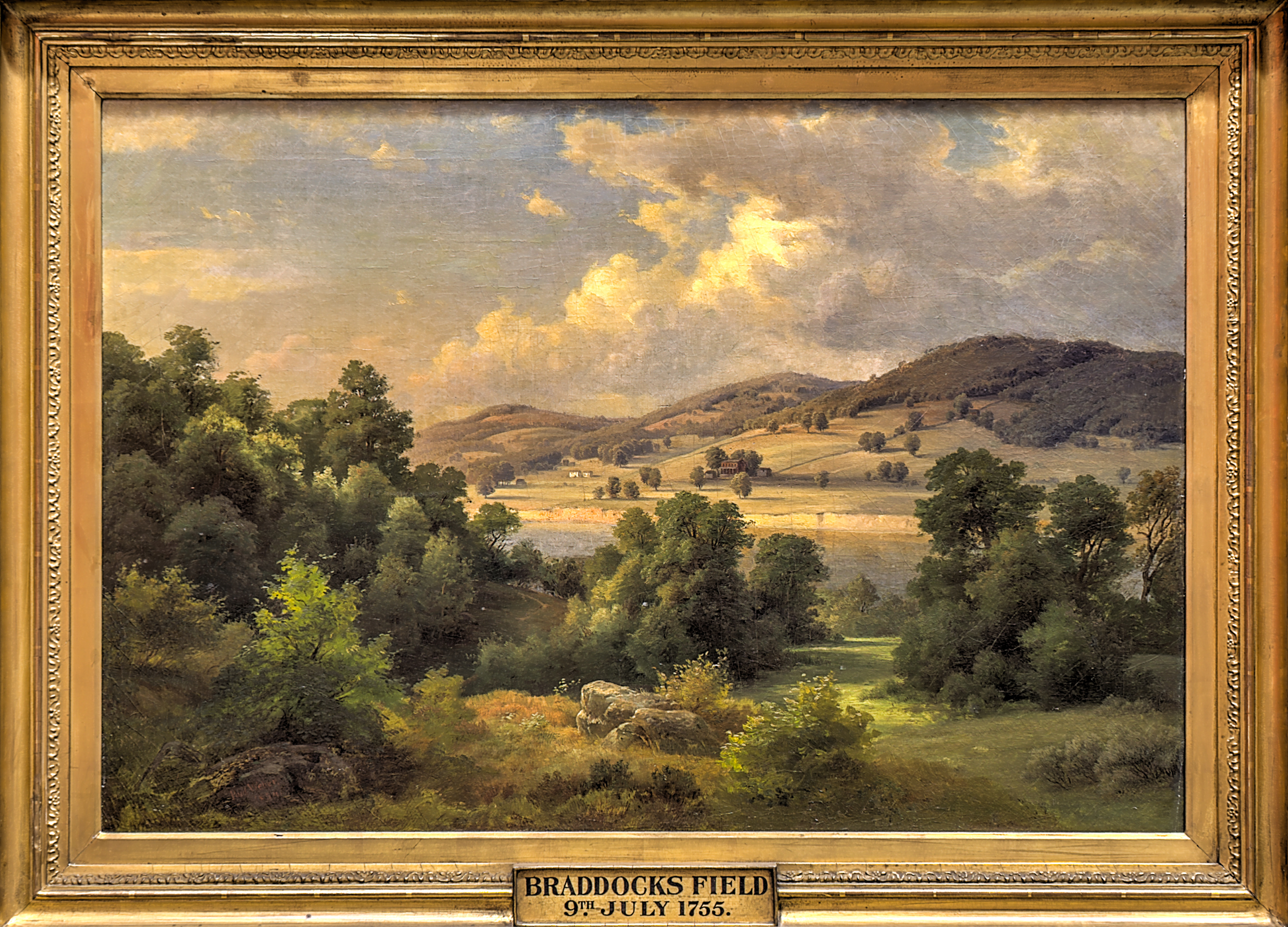
Braddock's Field as it appeared in 1854.

Native Americans inhabited the region in the 18th century. In 1742, Queen Alliquippa, a local Seneca leader, gave John Fraser several hundred acres of land.

The place became known as "Braddock's Field" after French and Indian forces from Fort Duquesne defeated British General Edward Braddock there, on July 9, 1755, in the Battle of the Monongahela. Braddock himself was mortally wounded, dying several days later. The bones of the soldiers killed in the battle were visible to passers-by for years after the battle.

The field was purchased in 1769 by John Fraser, an Indian trader who had been living there at the time of the battle. It was sold by his widow Jane Frazier after his death in 1773.

Braddock's Field also was the site of a rally of rebellious militiamen and farmers during the Whiskey Rebellion, prior to a massive march on the city of Pittsburgh on August 1, 1794.

The Edgar Thomson Steel Works is located nearby and may cover the former site of John Fraser's cabin.

Braddock's Field was also the location of Camp Copeland, a rendezvous for men who had been drafted into the Union forces during the American Civil War. At Camp Copeland the men would be trained and sent to their assigned regiments. Poor conditions and several deaths in March 1864 invited inspections and changes to the Camp. The Camp name was briefly changed to Camp Reynolds, but the old name was adopted again. Camp Copeland closed on April 29, 1865.

== Location ==
The towns of Braddock, Pennsylvania and North Braddock now occupy the approximate site of the battlefield. The exact location is disputed by some historians, but a Pennsylvania state historical marker, located at 549 Jones Avenue near a small recreation park, is generally considered the likely center of the battlefield. The sign reads, "July 9, 1755 Gen. Braddock's British forces en route to capture Fort Duquesne were ambushed and routed by French and Indians within present limits of Braddock and North Braddock, forcing retreat and failure of the expedition. Pennsylvania Historical and Museum Commission." A statue of George Washington by Frank Vittor stands nearby. A bronze plaque on a senior citizens apartment building on Sixth Street marks the furthest west Braddock's advance guard got before falling back to "Braddock's Field." Braddock is located at 40°24′13″N 79°52′07″W. According to a map in Crocker's book (references), Braddock crossed the Monongahela from the southwest at the south side of the current Edgar Thomson Steel Works just north of Turtle Creek, turned north along the base of the hill now occupied by the Grandview golf course, turned northwest roughly along Bell Avenue, and first encountered the French just south of where the railroad crosses Sixth Street. (The Braddock's Battlefield History Center is located just north of this spot, across the tracks.) His forces were strung out for at least a half mile from Sixth Street toward the river crossing and the French and Indians attacked from both sides.
