= Jean-Daniel Dumas =

18th century French army officer

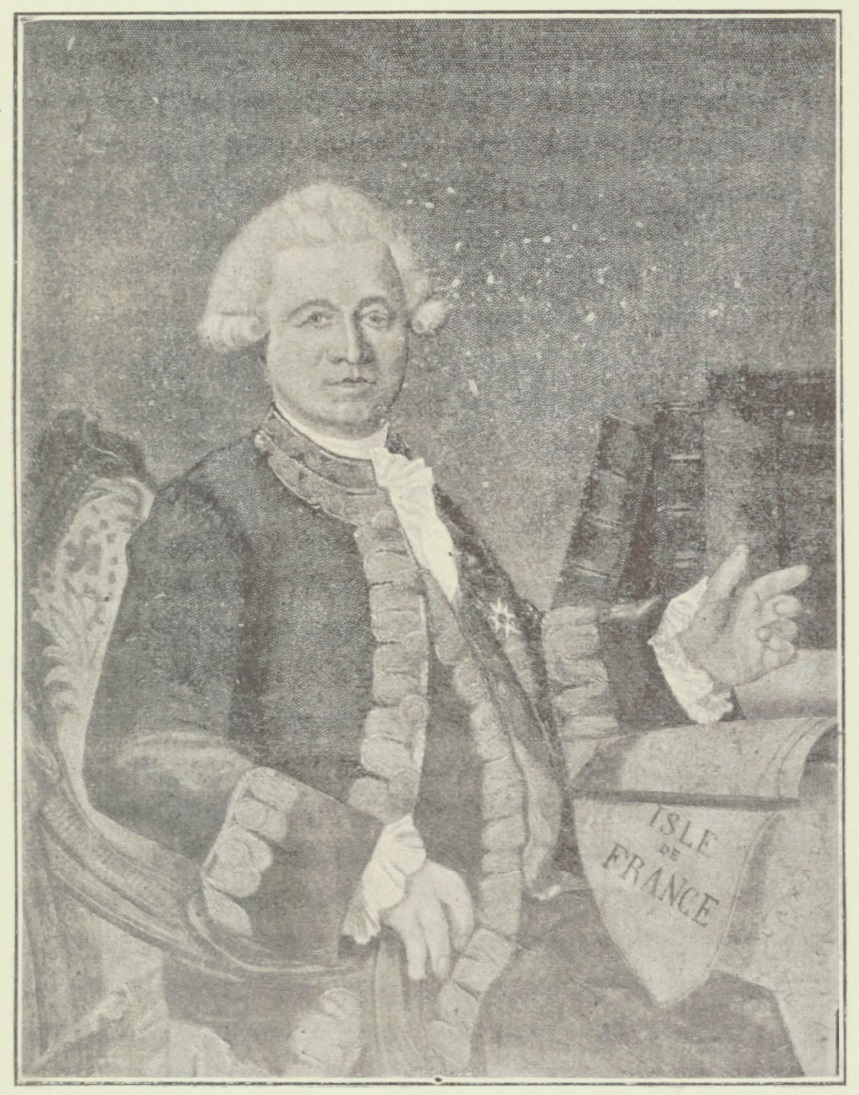
- Born: 24 February 1721; Montauban, France
- Died: 2 August 1794 (aged 73); Albias, France
- Relatives: Unmarried
- Military career
- Allegiance: Kingdom of France
- Branch: French Army; French Marines
- Service years: 1739-1750, 1768-1780; 1750-1768
- Rank: Colonel (Marines) 1761; Maréchal de camp (Army) 1780
- Commands: Town major of Quebec, 1757; Adjutant of Canadian Militia, 1757; Adjutant-general of French Marines in Canada, 1759; Commanding a brigade, 1759-1760; Commandant of Isle de France and Ile Bourbon, 1766-1768
- Conflicts: War of the Austrian Succession; Seven Years' War: Battle of the Monongahela Siege of Fort William Henry Battle of the Plains of Abraham Battle of Sainte-Foy Montreal Campaign
- Awards: Knight of the Order of St. Louis
- Other work

Jean-Daniel Dumas (24 February 1721 – 2 August 1794) was a French officer in the Seven Years' War. The French and Indians launched an attack on General Edward Braddock's column at the Battle of the Monongahela. Dumas and Charles Michel de Langlade took charge when their commanding officer, Daniel Liénard de Beaujeu, was shot dead in the opening moments of the battle.

== Biography ==
In 1742, Dumas joined the Agenais Regiment and participated in the War of the Austrian Succession. He used to serve in Corsica and Provence. In the spring of 1750 he sailed to Bordeaux for Acadia as captain of a company of naval troops, where he was assigned to Fort Gaspareaux during its construction. In the summer of 1753, he was stationed at Fort Le Boeuf. From 1754 he was posted to Fort Duquesne. He commanded the French regular forces, militia, and Native Americans who defeated General Edward Braddock's British army at the Battle of the Monongahela on July 9, 1755. Dumas was knighted for his military services on 17 March 1756 at the age of 35.

Commanding Fort Duquesne, after the reassignment of Claude-Pierre Pécaudy de Contrecœur, Dumas organized several Franco-Canadian raids with the Amerindian allies on the border of the province of Pennsylvania.

In 1757 Dumas returned to Montreal and took part in the expedition to capture Fort William-Henry. He was in Quebec for the siege of the city in 1759. In January 1759, he was appointed major general of naval troops. He participated in the Battle of Sainte-Foy in the spring of 1760. He took part in the Montreal Campaign which led to the city's surrender, following which he returned to France.

On July 17, 1766, Dumas was appointed first governor general of the Mascarene following the surrender of the archipelago to the King of France by the East India Company, then became brigadier-general before being recalled to metropolitan France in 1768.

He was promoted to field marshal in 1780.
