= John Fraser (frontiersman) =

18th century Pennsylvania fur trader, soldier and judge

- Born: 1721; Scotland
- Died: April 16, 1773 (aged 52); Bedford, Pennsylvania
- Burial place: Bedford, Pennsylvania
- Military career
- Allegiance: Great Britain
- Branch: British Army: Virginia Regiment
- Rank: Chief of scouts, Adjutant of Virginia Forces, Lieutenant of British Army, Captain of guides
- Conflicts: French and Indian War: Battle of the Great Meadows; Braddock Expedition; Battle of the Monongahela; Forbes Expedition

John Fraser (often incorrectly spelled Frazier, 1721 – 16 April 1773) was a fur trader licensed by the Province of Pennsylvania for its western frontier, an interpreter with Native Americans, a gunsmith, a guide and lieutenant in the British army, and a land speculator. He served in several British campaigns against the French and their allies in the vicinity of Fort Duquesne. Later in life he became a prominent landowner and was appointed justice of the peace, serving on the court until his death in 1773.

In 18th-century documents his surname is spelled three ways: Frazer, Frazier, and Fraser. Fraser is the common Scottish spelling of the name and is used by many of John Fraser's descendants. His wife is commonly known as Jane Frazier.

== Trading post at Venango ==
Born in the Scottish Highlands, Fraser, age 14, arrived in Pennsylvania in 1735 and settled for a short time near the Susquehanna River in Dauphin County. In 1737 he had a trading post at Paxtang township. In 1740 he established a fur trading post near the Native American village of Venango (now Franklin, Pennsylvania), at the junction of French Creek and the Allegheny River. Fraser bartered his gunsmith services, European manufactured goods, and alcohol with local Native Americans in exchange for pelts and furs. He finally obtained a Pennsylvania trader's license on August 10, 1747.

In July 1749 Pierre Joseph Céloron de Blainville passed through the area on his "lead plate expedition", making contact with Native American communities in what the French intended would be a "show of force" designed to intimidate tribal leaders. He also warned British fur traders to leave the Ohio Country. At the Seneca village of Buckaloons on Brokenstraw Creek, on July 31, Seneca leaders objected to the removal of the traders, in particular the blacksmith John Fraser, stating:

"If you compel the English to retire, who minister to our wants, and in particular the blacksmith who mends our guns and our hatchets, we will be forced to remain without succor and be exposed to the danger of dying of hunger and misery on the Beautiful River...Let us have, during this winter, or at least until we go hunting, the blacksmith."

In June 1752, at the Logstown Treaty Council, Fraser's gunsmith services were still considered so essential to the Native Americans that they demanded that, if he decided to leave the area, another gunsmith should be sent to replace him.

In 1752, Marquis Duquesne was appointed Governor General of New France and began a campaign to remove British traders from the Ohio Country, as "the nations of these localities are very badly disposed towards the French, [having been]...seduced by the allurements of cheap merchandise furnished by the English." In August 1753, the French decided to occupy Fraser's trading post, from which Fraser was absent at the time. The Lenape chief Custaloga assisted the French by capturing and handing over two traders who had just arrived at the trading post. Fraser and his employee William were forced to flee. Henry Bouquet reported that French troops "pursued Mr Fraizer and another Trader's man eight miles down the River, but could not overtake them." Seventy-five French soldiers took over Fraser's cabin, allowing Custaloga to confiscate Fraser's trade goods. Fraser's cabin was occupied by the French officer Philippe-Thomas Chabert de Joncaire, who met there with George Washington, Guyasuta, and Tanacharison on December 4, 1753. By the next year Fraser's cabin and his forge had been incorporated by the French into the new Fort Machault.

== Trading post at Turtle Creek ==
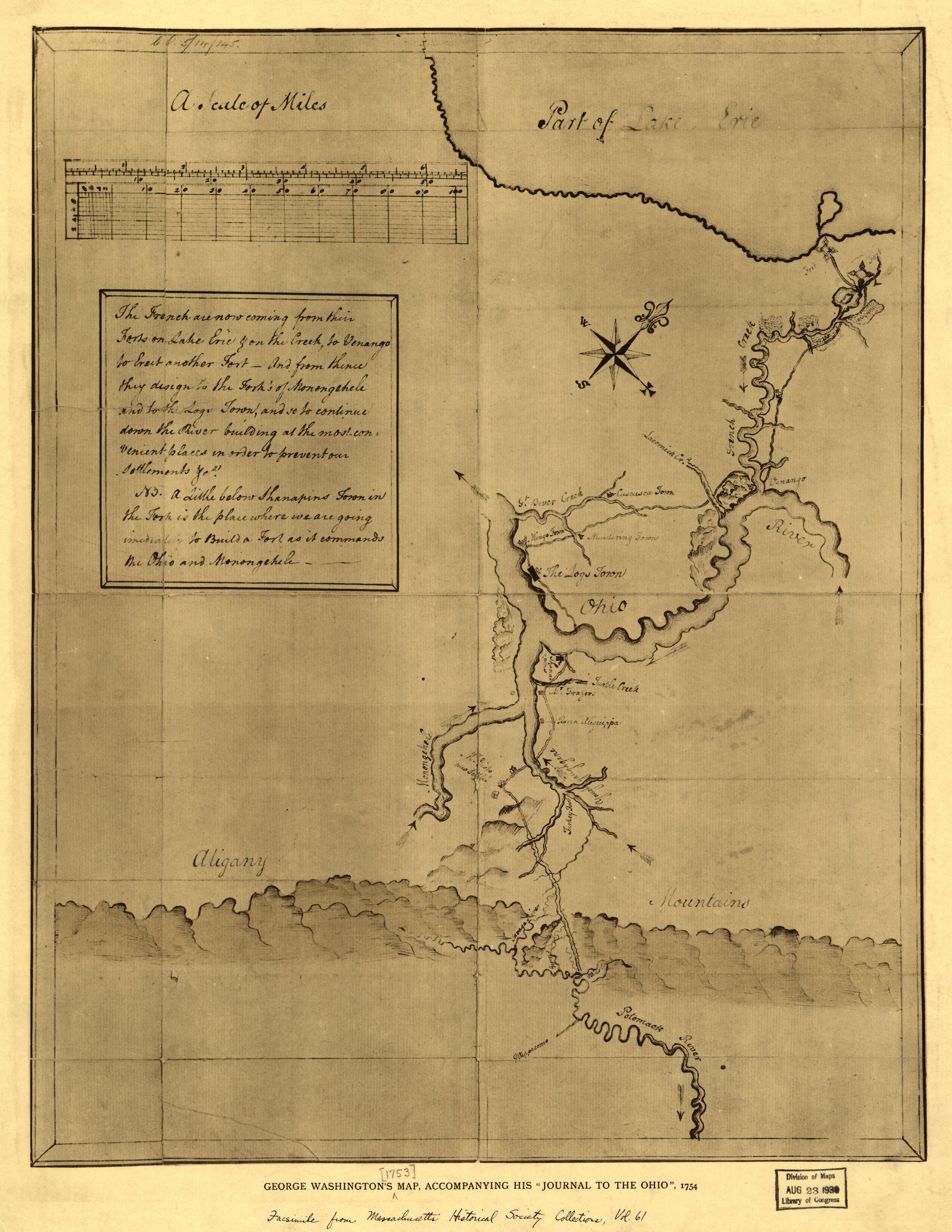
George Washington's 1754 map of the confluence of the Monongahela and the Allegheny rivers, showing Fraser's plantation ("Mr Frazer") just south of the forks, on Turtle Creek.

By August 1753 Fraser had established a new trading post at the mouth of Turtle Creek, a tributary of the Monongahela River. Before building his cabin, he consulted the Seneca leader Queen Alliquippa, who not only granted him permission but gave him several hundred acres of land. There he aided George Washington and his guide Christopher Gist during Washington's journey to meet with the French commander at Fort LeBoeuf. On November 22, 1753, Washington's party spent the night at Fraser's cabin. Because Turtle Creek was swollen by rain and snow and was impassable, Fraser loaned them a canoe to carry their baggage across the river, which they forded with their horses. After arriving at Fort Machault, George Washington asked Joncaire why Fraser had been forced from his post at Venango. Joncaire replied "That his Orders from their Gen’l, the Governor of Canada, were, Not to permit any English Subjects to trade on the Waters of the Ohio, but to seize their Goods and send them Prisoners to Quebeck," adding in reference to Fraser, "that Man was lucky that he made his Escape, or he would have sent him Prisoner to Canada." On their return from Fort LeBoeuf, they stopped at Fraser's cabin again on December 30, as Washington had fallen into the icy river and was exhausted.

== Fort Prince George ==
In January 1754, Fraser was offered a lieutenant's commission by William Trent, and served as second-in-command during the construction of Fort Prince George from February to April, 1754. He accepted the commission from Trent on condition that he be permitted to remain at his plantation at Turtle Creek and come to the fort only once a week or whenever necessary. When Fraser was informed that a sizeable French force was approaching the fort, he felt that his presence at the fort would not change the outcome, and left his subordinate, Ensign Edward Ward, to face the French. The fort was captured and destroyed, but Ward and his 41 men were allowed to withdraw. Governor Dinwiddie was outraged and wrote to Washington:

"The ill Conduct of Capt. Trent & his Lt Fraser, in leaving the Fort without Leave meets with just resentment here; I have order’d Colonel Fry to try them by a Court Martial, when I hope they will meet with such Punishment as this unaccountable Action deserves."

Fraser was almost court-martialed at Williamsburg for desertion, but he was released after Washington reminded Governor Dinwiddie that Fraser had accepted his lieutenant's commission with reservations.

== French and Indian War ==
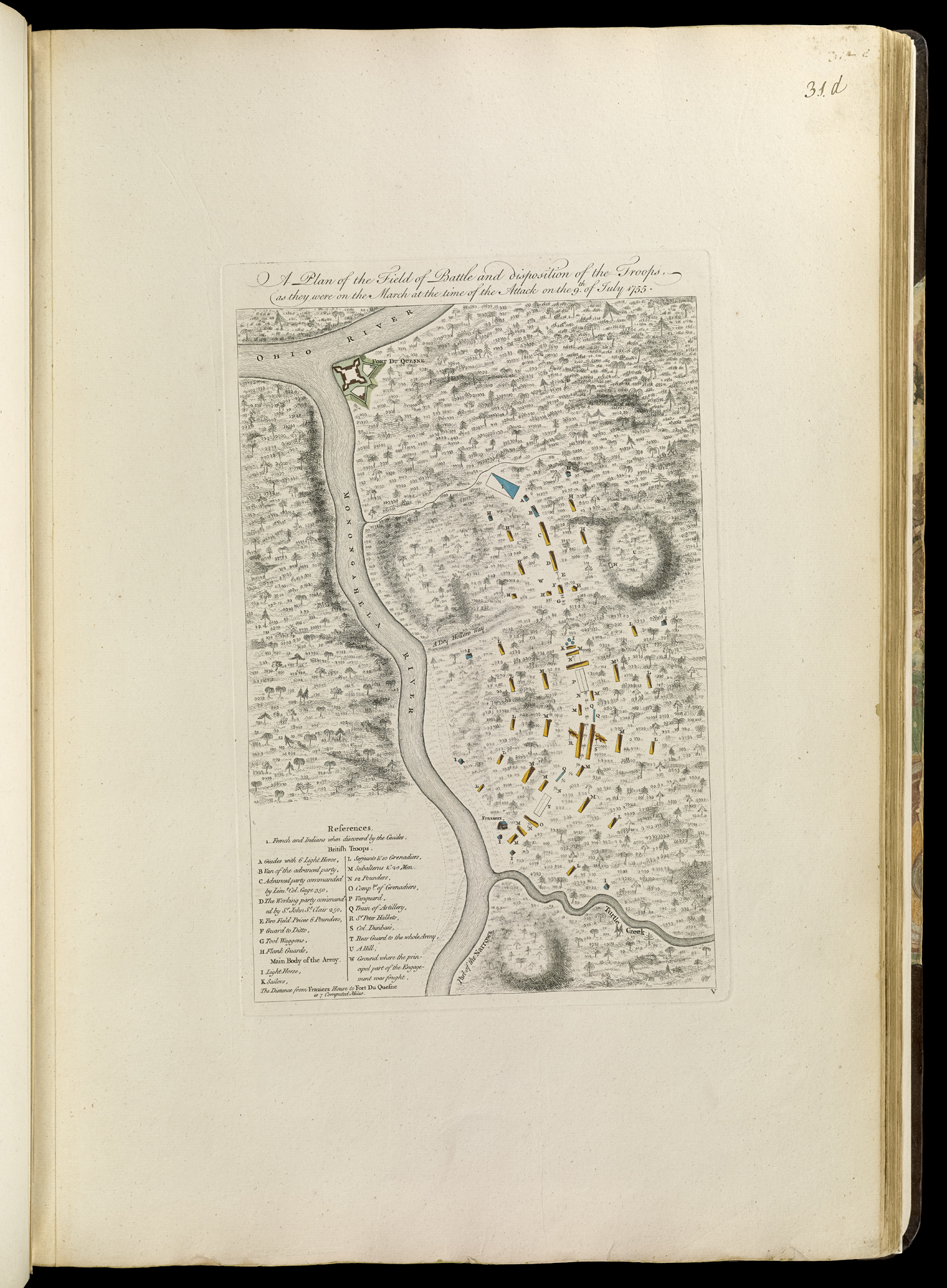
Plan of the Battle of the Monongahela on July 9, 1755, showing John Fraser's cabin at Turtle Creek ("Fraziers") at the bottom center of the page.

During the French and Indian War Fraser served against the French, under George Washington, General Edward Braddock, and General John Forbes. After the French captured Fort Prince George, Fraser decided to abandon his trading post and plantation at Turtle Creek. In June 1754, after loading his trade goods and other personal effects onto horses, Fraser was heading south when he met George Washington and his troops at Fort Necessity. Fraser was present at the Battle of Fort Necessity in July 1754, not as a combatant but because Washington had confiscated his horses. He lost all his supplies there, for which he repeatedly petitioned the Virginia government for reimbursement until his death. A petition by Fraser's widow in 1774 to the Virginia House of Burgesses includes the following statement:

"John Fraser...in June, 1754, met with the Troops of his Colony, commanded by George Washington, Esquire, at the place called Fort Necessity, or the Great Meadows; that Colonel Washington pressed several Horses of the said John Fraser, which were carrying his Effects, and employed them in bringing Stores, a Party of Men, and Ammunition and Provisions, to the Camp, whereby the said John Fraser was detained, until the Battle happened at that Place; when the Virginia Troops Capitulated, and all the said John Fraser's Goods were taken and plundered by the Enemy, for which loss the Petitioner cannot discover that he ever received any Satisfaction; and submitting the matter to the consideration of the House, and praying such an allowance as shall seem just."

Realizing Fraser's value to the Colony of Virginia during the impending conflict with France, Washington used his influence to have Fraser commissioned as adjutant to Virginia forces in August 1754.

Fraser married 19-year-old Jane Fraser (formerly Jane Bell and Jane McClain) in Winchester on August 8, 1754. They moved to the mouth of Evitts Creek near Fort Cumberland, Maryland. His skill as a gunsmith was useful when Washington asked him to repair broken firearms at Fort Cumberland in October 1755.

In November 1754, after receiving his adjutant's commission, he was assigned to teach seventy recruits how to use firearms. Fraser was later assigned to deliver supplies from Hampton, Virginia to a Captain Waggener, but the supplies arrived too late. Governor Dinwiddie then refused to honor several requests from Fraser for reimbursement, and Fraser resigned. Fraser accepted a position as chief of scouts in the army of General Braddock, and guided Braddock's force around the rugged and steep ground on the Monongahela River. Fraser also served as interpreter in Braddock's meetings with Native American allies. On July 8, 1755, as Braddock's troops were preparing to cross the Monongahela River, the Indians sent a delegation to the British to request a conference. Braddock sent Washington and Fraser. The Indians asked the British to halt their advance so that they could attempt to negotiate a peaceful withdrawal by the French from Fort Duquesne. Both Washington and Fraser recommended this to Braddock but he decided against it. The army forded the river just across from Fraser's old trading post at Turtle Creek, which was abandoned but still standing.

=== Capture of Jane Fraser ===
In October 1755, while traveling with one of her husband's employees, Mr. Bradley, to Fort Cumberland to purchase items at the fort's store, Fraser's wife Jane was attacked by Miami Indians. The Maryland Gazette reported on October 9:

"We are told that last Wednesday morning the Indians had...carried off a woman from Frazier's plantation...They shot the horse on which the man [Bradley] was riding, but as it did not fall immediately he made his escape. The woman, it is supposed, fell into their hands, as neither she or the horse on which she was riding have been seen since or heard of."

Mr. Bradley was killed and scalped, and Jane was taken on a 3-week journey to a village on the Great Miami River, possibly Pinkwi Mihtohseeniaki (near present-day Piqua, Ohio). Adopted by a prominent Miami family, she gave birth a month after her arrival, and although her captors treated the child kindly, he died after three months. After 13 months, while most of the village men were away raiding Pennsylvania settlements and the remaining men were out hunting, Jane escaped with the help of two other captives. They stole a little food and a rifle, but were afraid to hunt because they feared the gunshot would attract attention. After a week, the two men were too weak to continue and Jane decided to proceed on her own, eating roots and tree bark and hiding in hollow logs or trees at night. After eleven days she reached Oldtown, Maryland, and people there helped her return to Fort Cumberland. She arrived home in early November 1756, only to learn that her husband had remarried because he assumed that she was dead. John Fraser took her back, and he returned his second wife home to her father. "Being a woman of good sense," he compensated the second wife financially for the rest of her life.

=== Forbes Expedition ===
In March 1758, Brigadier-General John Forbes was looking for guides who could help his troops navigate the Pennsylvania country the army would pass through on the way to attack Fort Duquesne. He also wanted men who knew the local Native Americans and would be able to gather information about the French forces. Governor Horatio Sharpe of Maryland recommended Fraser, and he was offered a captain's commission and served as chief of the army's guides until August 1758, when he returned to Fort Cumberland.

== Later life and death ==
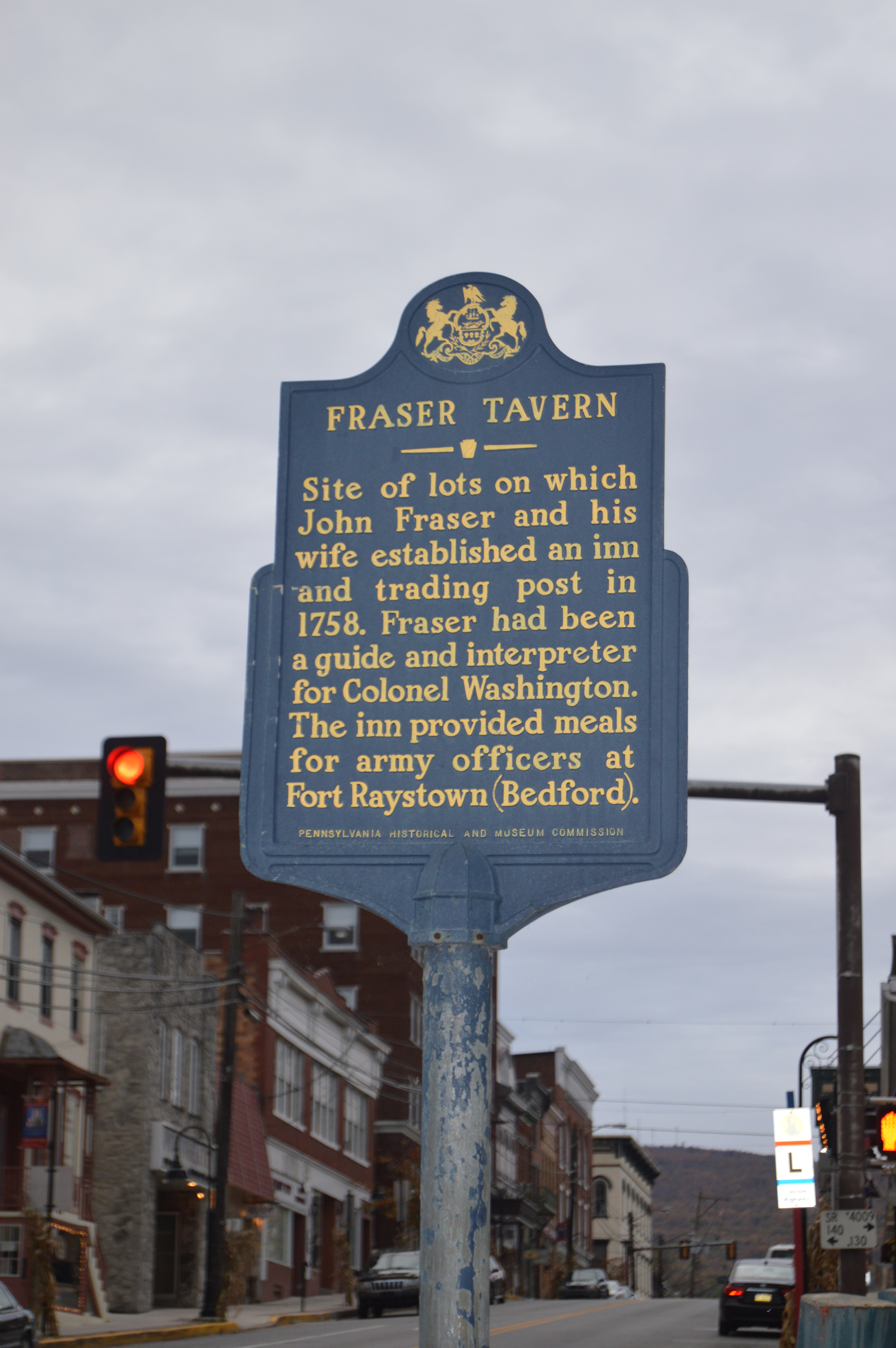
Historical marker at the site of Fraser's Inn, at the corner of East Pitt and North Richard Streets in downtown Bedford.

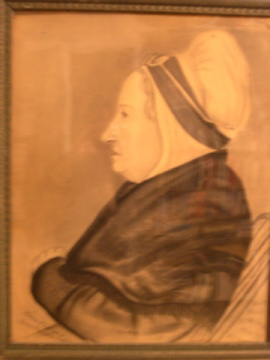
Fraser's widow Jane, before her death in 1815.

In 1758 Fraser and his wife and three young children relocated from Maryland to near Fort Bedford. Five more of their eight children were born there. Fraser established an inn later known as "Fraser's Inn," and began construction of a gunsmith workshop at his home, which was completed by November 1759. He repeatedly petitioned the government for restitution for his losses during his war service, and also speculated in land purchases on the frontier. He was granted 300 acres near Fort Ligonier along the Forbes Road in 1766. By 1767, as we know from tax records, Fraser owned 1000 acres along Wills Creek and 700 acres in Garlik Cove, in addition to four town lots, three horses and four cows. On April 1, 1769, he successfully purchased all of Braddock's Field as well as the cabin he had built there. By 1773 Fraser had another farm in Colerain Township.

On March 9, 1771, John Fraser was appointed justice of the peace for the newly formed Bedford County, Pennsylvania. Because of his judicial duties, Fraser's daughter Margaret took over his role as innkeeper. He ruled on criminal cases through 1771 until early 1773.

Fraser died suddenly on April 16, 1773. The orphan's court ruled that his widow Jane Fraser should sell some of the Fraser land to satisfy debts and to support her eight minor children. On October 14, 1774, she sold Braddock's battlefield to Daniel Razior. In 1790 Fraser's 300 acres near Fort Ligonier were sold to Father Theodore Brouwers, who founded there the first Catholic Church parish west of the Alleghenies, and by 1846 Saint Vincent College and Saint Vincent Archabbey were established (now the oldest Benedictine monastery in the United States).

== Legacy ==
Fraser's Turtle Creek cabin stood through the Battle of the Monongahela and for decades more, until about 1804. The site today is located in North Braddock, Pennsylvania on the land where, since 1872, sits the Edgar Thomson Steel Works established by Andrew Carnegie. The Braddock's Battlefield History Center is located close to the site of Fraser's cabin.

The Fraser's log home in Bedford changed hands numerous times and was renovated repeatedly until it was abandoned and destroyed in 1964 to make way for an extension of Maryland Route 51. A historical marker at the site of the home refers to Jane Frazier's capture and escape. Another historical marker can be seen at the site of Fraser's Inn in Bedford.

== In popular culture ==
John Fraser is the central character in Forge and Foundry, a 2025 historical novel by Jason Matthew Stanley. The book dramatizes Fraser's life on the eighteenth-century Pennsylvania frontier, depicting his work as a trader, blacksmith, and scout during the years leading up to the French and Indian War.

John Fraser and his wife Jane were portrayed in the 1947 film Unconquered, with Ward Bond as John Fraser and Virginia Campbell as Mrs. John Fraser.

John and Jane Fraser are the main characters in Red Morning, a historical novel by Ruby Frazier Frey (a descendent), published on January 1, 1946. The book focuses on Jane's capture and escape.
