= Jane Fraser =

Jane Fraser may refer to:

- Jane Frazier (1735−1815), or Fraser, pioneer from Virginia who was captured by Indians and escaped
- Jane Fraser, pen-name of Rosamunde Pilcher (1924−2019)
- Jane Fraser (born 1942), president of the Stuttering Foundation of America
- Jane Fraser (executive) (born 1967), CEO of Citigroup
