= Unconquered (1947 film) =

1947 film by Cecil B. DeMille

- Directed by: Cecil B. DeMille
- Written by: Charles Bennett; Fredric M. Frank; Jesse Lasky Jr. Jeanie MacPherson (uncredited)
- Produced by: Cecil B. DeMille
- Starring: Gary Cooper; Paulette Goddard; Howard da Silva; Boris Karloff; Cecil Kellaway; Ward Bond
- Narrated by: Cecil B. DeMille
- Cinematography: Ray Rennahan
- Edited by: Anne Bauchens
- Music by: Victor Young
- Distributed by: Paramount Pictures
- Release date: October 3, 1947
- Running time: 146 min.
- Country: United States
- Language: English
- Budget: $4,371,593
- Box office: $6,665,592

Unconquered is a 1947 American historical epic adventure film produced and directed by Cecil B. DeMille and starring Gary Cooper and Paulette Goddard. The supporting cast features Boris Karloff, Cecil Kellaway, Ward Bond, Howard da Silva, Katherine DeMille (the director's daughter), C. Aubrey Smith and Mike Mazurki. Released by Paramount Pictures, the film depicts the violent struggles between American colonists and Native Americans on the western frontier in the mid-18th century during the 1763 Pontiac's Rebellion, primarily around Fort Pitt (modern-day Pittsburgh). The film is characterized by DeMille's lavish style, including colourful costumes and sets, thousands of extras, violence, and sensationalism.

== Plot ==
In London in 1763, Abigail "Abby" Hale is tried for the death of a Royal Navy officer which occurred when she tried to save her sick brother from the press gang. The judge condemns her to be hanged, then offers her the "king's mercy": transportation to the British colonies in North America and a term of "not less than 14 years as an indentured servant, to be sold at auction". She chooses the latter.

Aboard ship as it nears Norfolk, Abby incurs the anger of trader Martin Garth, who then insists upon the auction being held there and then. There is a bitter bidding war between Garth and Captain Christopher Holden, which Holden wins with an exorbitant bid. A friend reminds Holden he is engaged. He sets Abby free, but afterward, his fiancée Diana informs him that she has married his brother.

Meanwhile, Garth bribes the slave dealer into saying that Holden was only jesting and never bought her, and destroys the bill of freedom. Garth takes Abby to the western frontier, where he is selling guns to the Indians towards the end of the French and Indian War. Holden's friend John Fraser shows him something he got from an Indian who tried to kill him. Holden and Abby's paths cross, but Garth convinces Holden that Abby came to him of her own accord.

Later, Garth makes it clear he is attracted to Abby. However, his Indian wife Hannah, daughter of Chief Guyasuta, shows up with an important message. Garth hastily departs for a meeting. At the meeting are George Washington, Colonel of the Virginia Regiment, his subordinate Holden, colonial governor Sir William, and others. They are deeply concerned about a possible native uprising. Holden fears that Pontiac will unite the tribes to wage war. Holden suggests sending someone to take "peace belts" to the Indians; Garth recommends Holden, and Holden accepts. However, when Holden and his two companions are ambushed, he realizes that he needs to deal with Garth. When he comes for Garth, he is reunited with Abby, and their mutual misunderstanding is cleared up before they flee together to Fort Pitt.

When Garth comes for his alleged bond slave Abby, Holden provokes him into a duel. However, Garth has a bill of sale for Abby, so the governor awards her to him. Before Garth can do anything, he is summoned by Guyasuta. He takes Abby along.

When a nearby settlement is wiped out, the governor prepares Fort Pitt for a siege.

Holden walks unarmed into Guyasuta's camp and, by trickery, manages to save Abby from being tortured to death. They escape and, seeing the aftermath of the slaughtering of settlers, head off to warn Fort Pitt against Indian treachery. However, Garth convinces the authorities that Holden is an untrustworthy deserter; Holden is sentenced to death and Abby is returned to Garth. She makes a bargain with Garth: she will willingly go with him in return for him arranging Holden's escape. He agrees, but plots Holden's death in the escape attempt. Hannah, having been told by Garth that he is abandoning her for Abby, warns Holden, takes his place and is fatally shot.

With no more food left, the acting British commander decides to accept Guyasuta's false promise to let them go unharmed. Fortunately, reinforcements arrive just in time, and the Indians flee. When the relief force enters the fort, however, the besieged see that the soldiers in the wagons are dead. Holden was unable to obtain reinforcements from the nearest British unit because it had suffered grievous casualties, but he was able to get a token force of mostly drummers and bagpipers of the famed Black Watch ... and corpses. Afterward, Holden kills Garth in a shootout, leaving him and Abby free to marry.

== Cast ==
- Gary Cooper as Captain Christopher Holden
- Paulette Goddard as Abby
- Howard da Silva as Garth
- Boris Karloff as Guyasuta, Chief of the Senecas
- Cecil Kellaway as Jeremy Love
- Ward Bond as John Fraser
- Virginia Campbell as Mrs. John Fraser
- Katherine DeMille as Hannah
- Henry Wilcoxon as Captain Steele
- Sir C. Aubrey Smith as Lord Chief Justice
- Victor Varconi as Captain Simeon Ecuyer
- Virginia Grey as Diana
- Mike Mazurki as Bone
- Porter Hall as Leach
- Richard Gaines as Colonel George Washington
- Gavin Muir as Lieut. Fergus McKenzie
- Jane Nigh as Evelyn
- Alan Napier as Sir William Johnson
- Marc Lawrence as Sioto, Medicine Man
- Raymond Hatton as Venango Scout
- John Mylong as Colonel Henry Bouquet
- London Astronomers:
  - George Kirby as Charles Mason
  - Leonard Carey as Jeremiah Dixon
- Frank R. Wilcox as Richard Henry Lee
- Davison Clark as Mr. Carroll of Virginia
- Griff Barnett as Brother Andrews of Pennsylvania
- Lloyd Bridges as Lieut. Hutchins
- Oliver Thorndike as Lieut. Baillie
- Nan Sunderland as Mrs. Pruitt
- Rus Conklin as Mamaultee
- Iron Eyes Cody as Red Corn
- Julia Faye as Widow Swivens
- Paul E. Burns as Dan McCoy
- Mary Field as Maggie
- Diane Wadelow as Lancashire Lass
- Clarence Muse as Jason
- Cecil B. DeMille as Narrator (uncredited)
- Robert Warwick as Pontiac (uncredited)
- Gordon Richards as Sheriff (uncredited)
- Jay Silverheels as an Indian (uncredited)
- Chief Thundercloud as Chief Killbuck
- Rodd Redwing as an Indian (uncredited)
- Chief John Big Tree as an Indian (uncredited)
- Dimples Cooper (Elizabeth Cooper) as Squaw (uncredited)

== Production ==
=== Development ===
DeMille was inspired to create the film after reading The Judas Tree by Neil Swanson (1896–1983). The novel described how white men and women who had been convicted in England were sent to 18th-century America to be sold as slaves. DeMille bought the rights to the novel and hired Swanson to write a new book that would be titled Unconquered: A Novel of the Pontiac Conspiracy, using the film script in development as his source. The film script was written by Charles Bennett, Jesse Lasky Jr., and Fredric M. Frank; DeMille also paid two experts to research "the birth of freedom, and the beginning of the death of slavery, in colonial America", paying $100,000 for their services. However, DeMille was more interested in the romanticization of American colonial conquest and the demonization of Native Americans who stood in the way of it than with full historical accuracy. The script is littered with stereotypical clichés about massacre-happy Indians; for example, Paulette Goddard's character proclaims: "The Indians will always burn, torture, and kill to get back the wilderness".

DeMille spent months polishing the dialogue, but both Cooper and Goddard were dissatisfied with their lines. For Cooper, Lasky dutifully rewrote one scene several times, but Cooper refused to say two of the speeches.

=== Budget ===
The production cost $4.3 million, and ran $394,000 over budget as well as nine days over its shooting schedule. Actor salaries came in at $1 million, the largest salary outlay in DeMille's career to date. Cooper received $300,000, twice his usual fee, including a percentage of the profits, and Goddard earned $112,000.

=== Casting ===
Unconquered was the last of four films which Cooper made with DeMille. DeMille had originally wanted to cast the Scottish actress Deborah Kerr in the role of Alice Hale, but could not meet her salary demand. The cast included 25 name players, and 4,325 costumed extras were also employed. Thirteen stunt performers were employed in the production.

Most of the actors cast as Native American characters were Caucasian. DeMille asked Boris Karloff to study the Seneca language before playing Chief Guyasuta. The only Indians in the cast, playing bit parts, were Chief John Big Tree, Rodd Redwing, Jay Silverheels, and Chief Thundercloud. Iron Eyes Cody (an Italian-American actor) was also credited as an Indian language consultant. DeMille did the voice-over narration.

=== Filming ===
Most of the filming was done on Hollywood sound stages, with some outdoor scenes filmed in western Pennsylvania and river scenes filmed on the Snake River in Idaho. The waterfall scene, in which Cooper's and Goddard's characters escape the Indians by riding a canoe down the rapids and then jumping off to grab an overhanging tree branch as the canoe careens down the falls, was filmed at two different locations—one a river with only rapids and the other a river with only falls. The two rivers were matted together in post-production to appear as one body of water; artists also matte-painted an overhanging tree branch into each frame. Stunt performers Ted Mapes and Lila Finn handled the canoe riding and jumping-off scenes on the rapids, while Mapes and Polly Burson were the stunt doubles who land on a rocky ledge under the waterfall, which was filmed on a soundstage. Cooper and Goddard were then filmed riding the canoe and jumping off on a soundstage backed by a rear-projection screen.

For the climactic attack on Fort Pitt, DeMille sought to create a spectacular, brutal battle that had never been filmed before and that would wow theatergoers. The scene, which cost $300,000 to stage, involved nearly 800 extras, along with "three hundred pounds of dynamite, fifty pounds of flash powder, fifty flintlocks, and three hundred fireballs". Goddard refused to stand in the scene while fireballs were being hurled, which infuriated DeMille, who shouted, "Get her out of here! Get her out before I kill her!" The director would not speak to Goddard again for years.

Cooper's character uses authentic 18th-century pistols from DeMille's private collection.

== Release ==
The film was released on October 3, 1947. A month before release, Paramount arranged for Cooper, da Silva, and Karloff to promote the film on its 15-minute radio show, "Paramount Star Interviews", which was syndicated across the U.S.

=== Box office ===
Unconquered earned $4.63 million in domestic box office receipts, making it one of the highest-grossing films of 1947. However, due to the film's bloated budget, the film lost almost $1.8 million.

The film was released on DVD by Universal Pictures Home Entertainment in 2007.

== Critical reception ==
Critics generally panned the screenplay for its clichéd dialogue and situations, but admitted to liking the film anyway. Critic James Agee writing in Time called the film "a huge, high-colored chunk of hokum; but the most old-fashioned thing about it is its exuberance, a quality which 66-year-old Director DeMille preserves almost single-handed from the old days when even the people who laughed at movies couldn't help liking them". Bosley Crowther, writing for The New York Times, agreed that "Unconquered is a picture worth seeing, if for nothing else but laughs". But he added that while the film uses "the oldest dime-store clichés"—including "Indian fights, tavern brawling and a canoe going over a waterfall"—it exerts a "magnetic pull" under DeMille's direction. Crowther also noted that the film contains all of the usual DeMille touches, including "Paulette Goddard as the red-headed, flashing-eyed slave, exhibited in numerous situations, from a bathtub to an Indian torture stake".

Mountain Xpress called the film "preposterous in the way that only a Cecil B. DeMille movie can be". Yet its reviewer gave the film 4 ½ out of 5 stars, calling it "massively entertaining". He elaborated:

The bad guys are very bad, the good guys very credulous, the hero very smart and honorable. It is a "perfect" DeMille picture. Everything you expect is here—including a bathtub scene (in a barrel) for a very fetching Paulette Goddard. It's all bigger than it needs to be. It's very Hollywood—even to the constant misunderstandings between Cooper and Goddard—not to mention the casting of Boris Karloff as the chief of the Senecas. And we also get DeMille's adopted daughter Katherine DeMille as Karloff's daughter. There's excitement, danger, romance, adventure, comedy, you name it. It's not a great film, but it's one hell of a movie.

Critics also praised the acting and cinematography. Variety, which derided the "frequently inept script", praised the actors' performances, noting that this was "a great tribute to the cast because that dialog and those situations try the best of troupers". According to film critic Emanuel Levy, the "sex appeal" of Cooper and Goddard, he gallantly clad in American colonial costumes and she in the garb of a red-haired slave, ensured its popularity at the box office. Levy also called the Technicolor cinematography by Ray Rennahan "impressive in an eye-popping manner".

In 2025, The Hollywood Reporter listed Unconquered as having the best stunts of 1947.

== Accolades ==
The film was nominated for a 1947 Academy Award for Best Special Effects.

== See also ==
- List of American films of 1947
- Gary Cooper filmography
- Boris Karloff filmography

== Sources ==
- Berumen, Frank Javier Garcia (2019). American Indian Image Makers of Hollywood. McFarland. ISBN 978-1-476678-13-9.
- Birchard, Robert S. (2004). Cecil B. DeMille's Hollywood. University Press of Kentucky. ISBN 978-0-813123-24-0.
- Gregory, Mollie (2015). Stuntwomen: The Untold Hollywood Story. University Press of Kentucky. ISBN 978-0-813-16624-7.
- Jacobs, Stephen (2011). Boris Karloff: More Than a Monster. Tomahawk Press. ISBN 978-0-955767-04-3.
- Meyers, Jeffrey (2001). Gary Cooper: American Hero. Rowman & Littlefield. ISBN 978-0-815411-40-6.
- Nollen, Scott Allen (2018). Boris Karloff: A Gentleman's Life. Midnight Marquee & BearManor Media. ISBN 978-1-887664-23-3.
- Presley, Cecilia DeMille; Vieira, Mark A. (2014). Cecil B. DeMille: The Art of the Hollywood Epic. Hatchette UK. ISBN 978-0-762455-37-9.
