= Daniel Liénard de Beaujeu =

French military officer (1711–1755)

Daniel Hyacinthe Liénard de Beaujeu
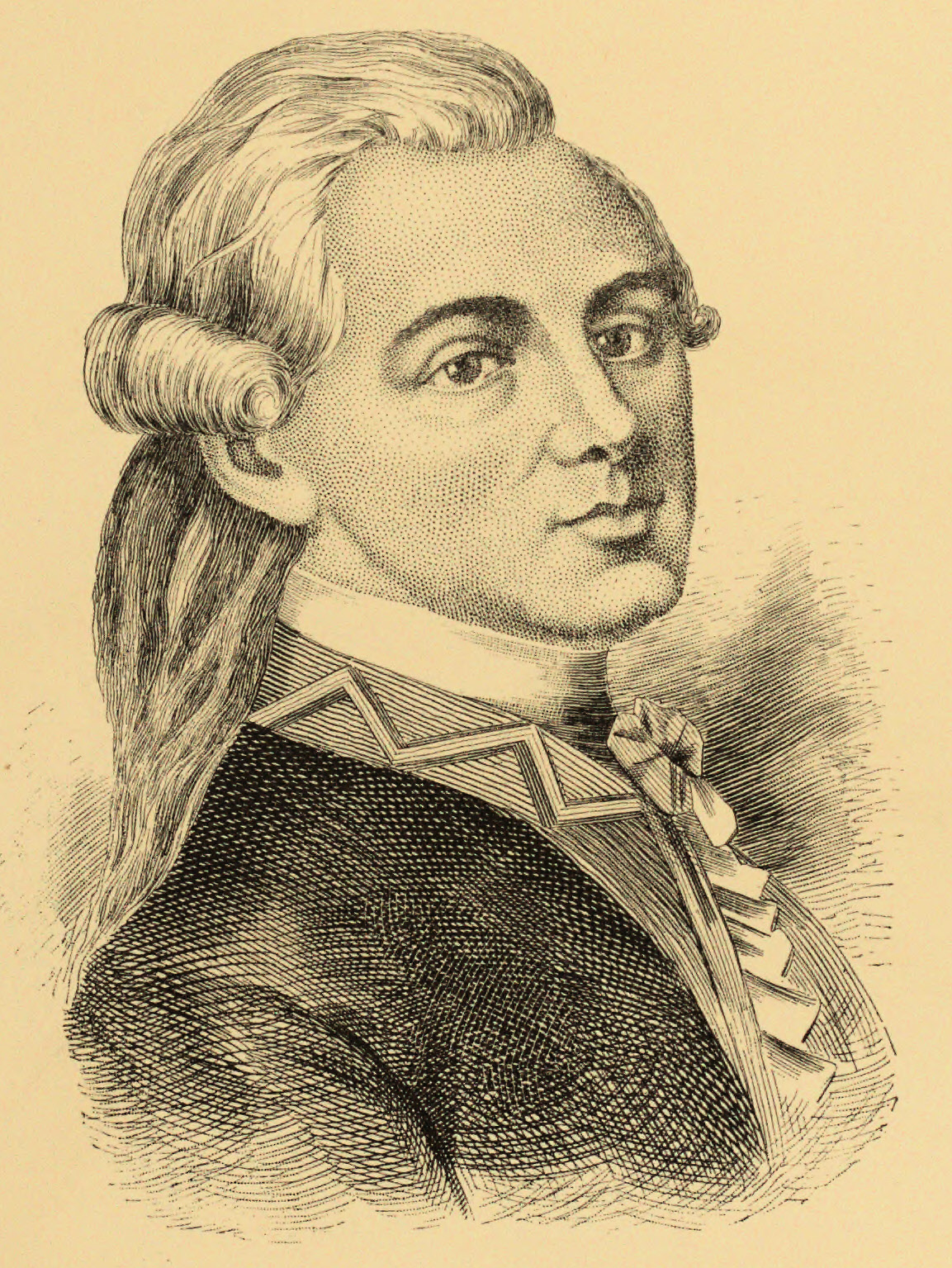
- Born: 9 or 19 August 1711; Ville-Marie, Montréal, New France
- Died: 9 July 1755 (aged 43); Fort Duquesne, New France
- Military career
- Allegiance: Kingdom of France
- Branch: Compagnies franches de la marine
- Service years: 1728–1755
- Rank: Captain
- Conflicts: King George's War; French and Indian War: Battle of the Monongahela †

Daniel Hyacinthe Liénard de Beaujeu (9 or 19 August 1711 – 9 July 1755) was a Canadian officer during King George's War and the French and Indian War. He participated in the Battle of Grand Pre (1747). He also organized the force that attacked General Edward Braddock's army after it forded the Monongahela River. The event was later dubbed the Battle of the Monongahela. Beaujeu led his small force into the attack, where he was shot dead in the opening moments when the attack was launched on July 9, 1755. However, his adoption of Native American customs, such as wearing war paint and regalia, helped raise the morale and fighting tenacity of the warriors under his command.

== Biography ==
Daniel Hyacinthe Liénard de Beaujeu was the son of Louis Liénard de Beaujeu and Denise-Thérèse Migeon. On March 4, 1737, he married Michelle-Elisabeth Foucault, with whom he had nine children. He was an officer during the French and Indian War.

Recently sent to relieve Claude-Pierre Contrecœur, the Commander at Fort Dusquesne (although he had not yet officially done so), he organized the attack on the troops of General Braddock while they crossed the Monongahela River in order to besiege Fort Duquesne in New France. Leading a small force composed of regular soldiers, Canadian militia, and a majority of native Indians, he managed to defeat Braddock's army.

Although killed at the beginning of the confrontation, he remained famous for having used Indian habits, such as the use of war paint during the ambush. He was buried under the walls of Fort Duquesne (today Pittsburgh, Pennsylvania).
