= Nicholas Meriwether =

Landowner in colonial Virginia (1665–1744)

Col. Nicholas Meriwether (October 26, 1665 – 1744) was a planter in the Colony of Virginia.

Meriwether amassed a huge quantity of land; owning around 33,000 acres in total. In 1735 he began building his plantation home known as "The Farm", in Goochland County, Virginia. The area later became the site of the city of Charlottesville, Virginia in Albemarle County.

He married Elizabeth Crawford, the daughter of Col. David Crawford one time Virginia Burgess. They had nine children, four sons and five daughters.

The will of Nicholas Meriwether is notable as being one of the longest on record during the colonial period of Virginia. It was witnessed by the father of Thomas Jefferson, Peter Jefferson.
