= Jane Frazier =

Virginia pioneer kidnapped by Native Americans

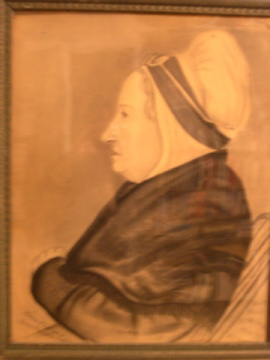
- Jane Frazier
- Born: Jane Bell; January 1, 1735; Winchester, Colony of Virginia
- Died: April 14, 1815 (aged 80); Schellsburg, Pennsylvania, U.S.
- Known for: Escape from Native American captivity in 1756
- Spouses: Edward McClain, John Fraser, Richard Delapt
- Children: Benjamin, Margaret, William, James, Jane, Catherine, Mary, Amelia
- Parent: James Bell

Jane Frazier (or Fraser, sometimes Fraizier, also referred to as Jean or Jenny; January 1, 1735 – April 14, 1815) was a Virginia pioneer captured by Native Americans in the 18th century. The wife of Scottish frontiersman John Fraser, she was taken prisoner by Miami people and held in a Miami village in Ohio for 13 months before escaping and traveling through the wilderness to return home. Her story was transcribed from her diary and later published.

== Birth and early life ==
Jane Bell was born on January 1, 1735 in Winchester, Virginia. At 18, she married Captain Edward McClain, who died in 1753. At 19, she met John Fraser, a gunsmith who was repairing rifles for George Washington in Winchester. They married in Winchester on August 8, 1754 and moved to the mouth of Evitts Creek near Fort Cumberland, Maryland, where Fraser had a farm and was preparing to build a gunsmith workshop.

== Capture and escape ==
In October 1755, while traveling with one of her husband's employees, Mr. Bradley, to Fort Cumberland to purchase items at the fort's store, Jane was attacked by Miami Indians. Mr. Bradley was killed and scalped, and Jane was taken on a 3-week journey to a village on the Great Miami River, possibly Pinkwi Mihtohseeniaki (near present-day Piqua, Ohio). Adopted by a prominent Miami family, she gave birth a month after her arrival, and although her captors treated the child kindly, he died after three months.

After 13 months, while most of the village men were away raiding Pennsylvania settlements and the remaining men were out hunting, Jane escaped with the help of two other captives, Dutch men who had been captured in Pennsylvania. They stole a little food and a broken rifle, which they were able to repair, but they were afraid to hunt because they feared the gunshot would attract attention. After a week, they shot and killed a wild turkey, which they ate raw, fearing that smoke from a fire would give away their location. The next day, the two men were too weak to continue and Jane decided to proceed on her own, eating roots and tree bark and hiding in hollow logs or trees at night. After eleven days she reached Oldtown, Maryland, and people there helped her return to Fort Cumberland. She arrived home in early November 1756, only to learn that her husband had remarried because he assumed that she was dead. John Fraser took her back, and he returned his second wife home to her father. "Being a woman of good sense," he compensated the second wife financially for the rest of her life.

== Return to Maryland ==
Following her return, Frazier was evidently interviewed by Colonel Adam Stephen, who wrote on November 14 to Governor William Denny: "By a woman who once belonged to John Fraser (his wife or mistress) and has now, after being prisoner with Shingas, &c, thirteen months, made her escape from Muskingum, we learn that Shingas and some Delawares live near the head of that River." Frazier probably passed through the village of Muskingum on her way to the Miami village from which she escaped.

In a November 30 letter from Colonel John Armstrong to Governor Denny, Armstrong reports that "We hear that two men and one woman (the Wife or Miss of Jon Frazer) has made their Escape to Fort Cumberland," indicating that Frazier's two Dutch companions survived.

Although Frazier had been captured by Miami Indians and held in a Miami village, several contemporary documents report that the Lenape leaders Shingas and Pisquetomen knew of her capture and escape. In a peculiar postscript to Frazier's story, Christian Frederick Post wrote in his diary that while traveling with Pisquetomen in October 1758, they passed through Bedford (then known as Raystown), where Pisquetomen recognized "Jenny Frazer": "Pesquitomen, finding Jenny Frazer there, who had been their prisoner, and escaped, spoke to her a little rashly." Later, as they were preparing to leave, Post noted: "Pesquitomen, before we went from hence, made it up with Jenny Frazer, and they parted good friends."

== Later life and death ==
In 1759, John and Jane Fraser moved near Fort Bedford. They had eight children: Benjamin, Margaret, William, James, Jane, Catherine, Mary, and Amelia. After the death of John Fraser on April 16, 1773, Jane married Richard DeKapt (Delapt), which they changed to Dunlap. Jane Frazier died April 14, 1815, in Schellsburg, Bedford County, Pennsylvania and was buried at "the King's Burying Ground".

== Sources ==
Frazier's captivity narrative was transcribed from her diary in 1897 by her great-grandson, Colonel William T. Beatty, and first published on November 9, 1900 in the Delphi Times of Delphi, Indiana. It was later published again in the History of Allegany County in 1923.

== Memorialization ==
The Fraser's log home in Cumberland, Maryland, changed hands numerous times and was renovated repeatedly until it was abandoned and destroyed in 1964 to make way for an extension of Maryland Route 51. A historical marker at the site of the home refers to Jane Frazier's capture and escape. Another historical marker can be seen at the site of Fraser's Inn in Bedford.

A housing complex on Memorial Ave. in Cumberland, Maryland is named Jane Frazier Village in Jane's honor.

== In popular culture ==
Jane and John Fraser are the subjects of Forge and Foundry, a 2025 historical novel by American author Jason Matthew Stanley. Jane Fraser is the central subject of the 2026 sequel, Trial and Tribulation, which depicts her abduction by Lenape raiders following the British defeat at the Battle of the Monongahela and her survival in captivity on the Pennsylvania frontier.

Frazier's capture and escape are described in Red Morning, a novel published by Ruby Frazier Parsons Frey, a direct descendant, in 1946.

Jane Frazier and her husband John were portrayed in the 1947 film Unconquered, with Ward Bond as John Fraser and Virginia Campbell as Mrs. John Fraser.

== Bibliography ==
- Edward C. Papenfuse et al., Maryland: A New Guide to the Old Line State, Johns Hopkins University 1999, ISBN 978-0-8018-5980-9.
- Ruby Frazier Frey, Red Morning, G.P. Putnam's Sons 1946, ASIN B0007DQ41Y, LC Control Number 46006088.
- "The Old Pike Post", Genealogical Society of Allegany County, Maryland, Vol. 16, No. 3 September 1999.
