= Claude-Pierre Pécaudy de Contrecœur =

Claude-Pierre Pécaudy de Contrecœur (French pronunciation: [klod pjɛʁ pekodi də kɔ̃tʁəkœʁ]) was an officer in the colonial regular troops (troupes de la marine), seigneur, and member of the Legislative Council of New France. Born on December 28, 1705, at Contrecœur, Quebec, son of Francois-Antoine Pécaudy de Contrecœur, a seigneur and officer in the colonial regulars, and Jeanne de Saint-Ours. Died on December 13, 1775, in Montreal, Quebec.

He was active in the establishment of French power in the Ohio Country, and was the commander of Fort Duquesne (at the site of modern Pittsburgh, Pennsylvania) in 1755 when it was threatened by Edward Braddock. Born into a family with large landholdings in the Saint Lawrence River valley, he stayed in North America after the French and Indian War and its fall of New France to the British. He was called "the third most influential Canadian" by the British governor of the Province of Quebec, Guy Carleton.
