= Braddock's Battlefield History Center =

- Established: 2012; 14 years ago
- Location: North Braddock, Pennsylvania, U.S.
- Coordinates: 40°24′20″N 79°51′52″W
- Type: History museum
- Collections: History of the Braddock Expedition and Battle of the Monongahela
- Founder: Robert T. Messner
- Website: www.braddocksbattlefield.org

Braddock's Battlefield History Center is a small American museum and visitors center that is located on the site of the Battle of the Monongahela of July 9, 1755.

It features a collection of art, documents, and artifacts about the Braddock Expedition and the French and Indian War as it unfolded at the Forks of the Ohio. Located seven miles (11 km) east of downtown Pittsburgh in North Braddock, Pennsylvania, it is housed in a renovated car dealership along with a small gymnastics company on a three-acre parcel on a hillside that overlooks the Monongahela River Valley and the historic Edgar Thomson Works of United States Steel.

== Background ==
The museum was created by Robert T. Messner, a retired Pittsburgh lawyer and grandfather, with the support of local foundations, and it opened to the public on August 18, 2012.

In December 2018, Messner donated the History Center to Fort Ligonier, which has operated the Center since May 2019.
