= Edward Braddock =

British Army officer (1695–1755)

Major-General Edward Braddock
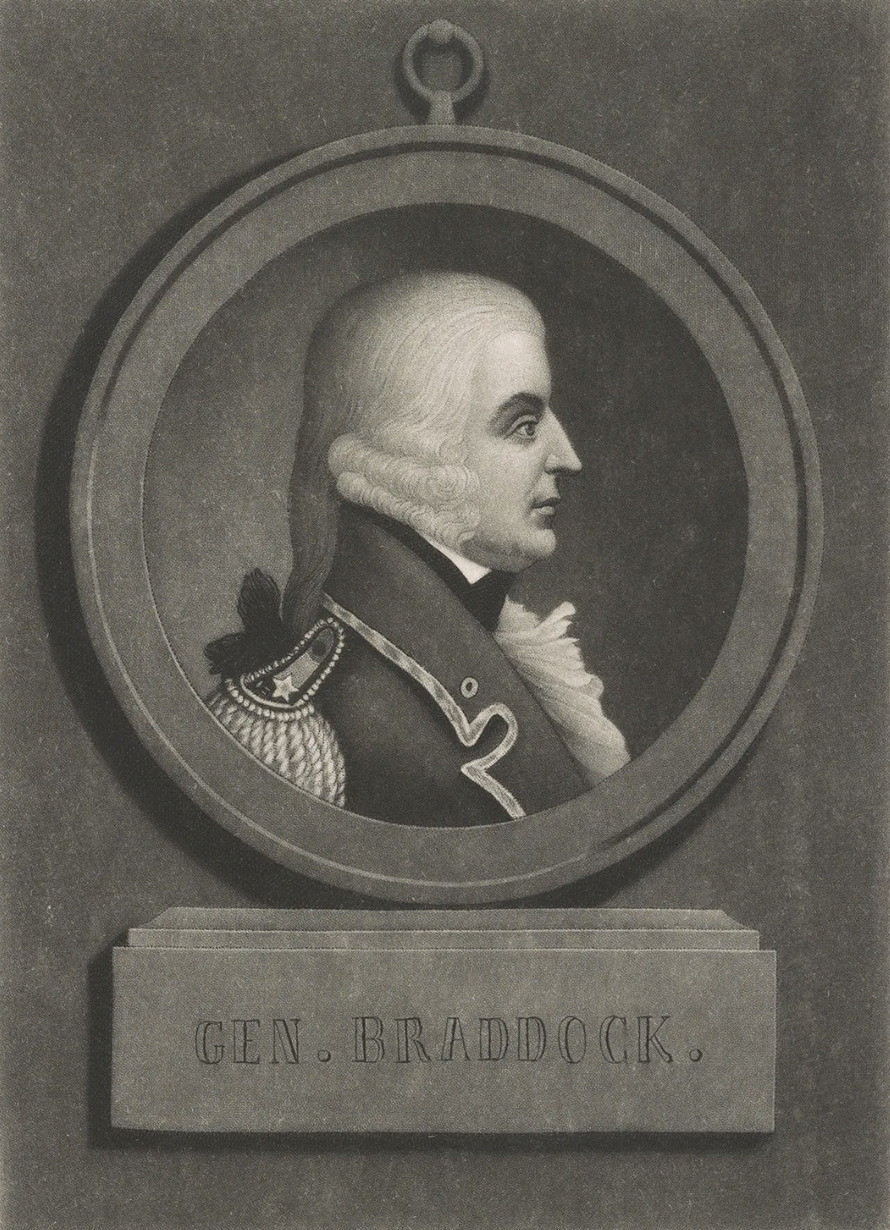
- Portrait by William Sartain, 1899
- Born: January 1695; London, England
- Died: 13 July 1755 (aged 60); Near Great Meadows, Pennsylvania
- Burial place: Fort Necessity National Battlefield
- Military career
- Allegiance: Great Britain
- Branch: British Army
- Service years: 1710–1755
- Rank: Major general
- Unit: 2nd Regiment of Foot Guards
- Commands: 14th Regiment of Foot
- Conflicts: War of the Austrian Succession; Siege of Bergen op Zoom (1747); French and Indian War; Battle of the Monongahela †

Major-General Edward Braddock (January 1695 – 13 July 1755) was a British Army officer who served in the War of the Austrian Succession and French and Indian War. He is best known for his command of a disastrous expedition against French forces in the Ohio River Valley in 1755 which led to his death.

== Early career ==
Edward Braddock was born in London, England in January 1695, the son of Major-general Edward Braddock of the 2nd Regiment of Foot Guards and his wife. Braddock followed his father into the British Army; at the age of 15, he was commissioned at the rank of ensign into his father's regiment on 11 October 1710. Braddock was promoted to lieutenant of the regimental grenadier company in 1716. On 26 May 1718, he fought a duel in Hyde Park, London with a British colonel named Waller.

Braddock was promoted to captain in 1736, at the age of 41. He was promoted again to major in 1743, and was made lieutenant colonel of the regiment on 21 November 1745. During the War of the Austrian Succession, Braddock participated in the siege of Bergen op Zoom in 1747. On 17 February 1753, he was appointed as colonel of the 14th Regiment of Foot, and in the following year was promoted to the rank of major general.

== North America and death ==
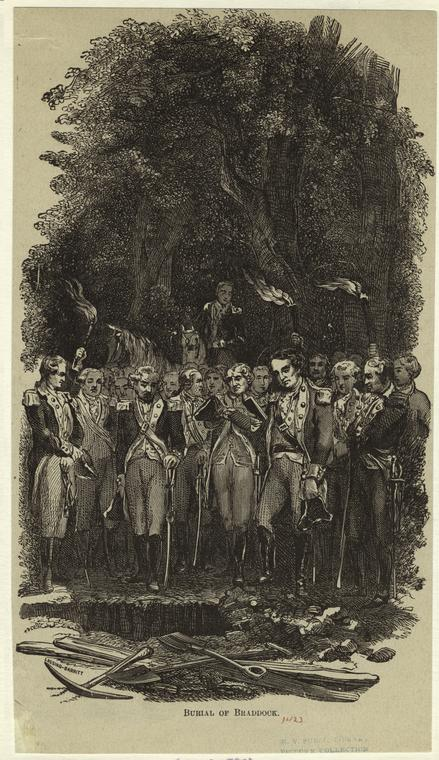
19th-century engraving of Braddock's burial

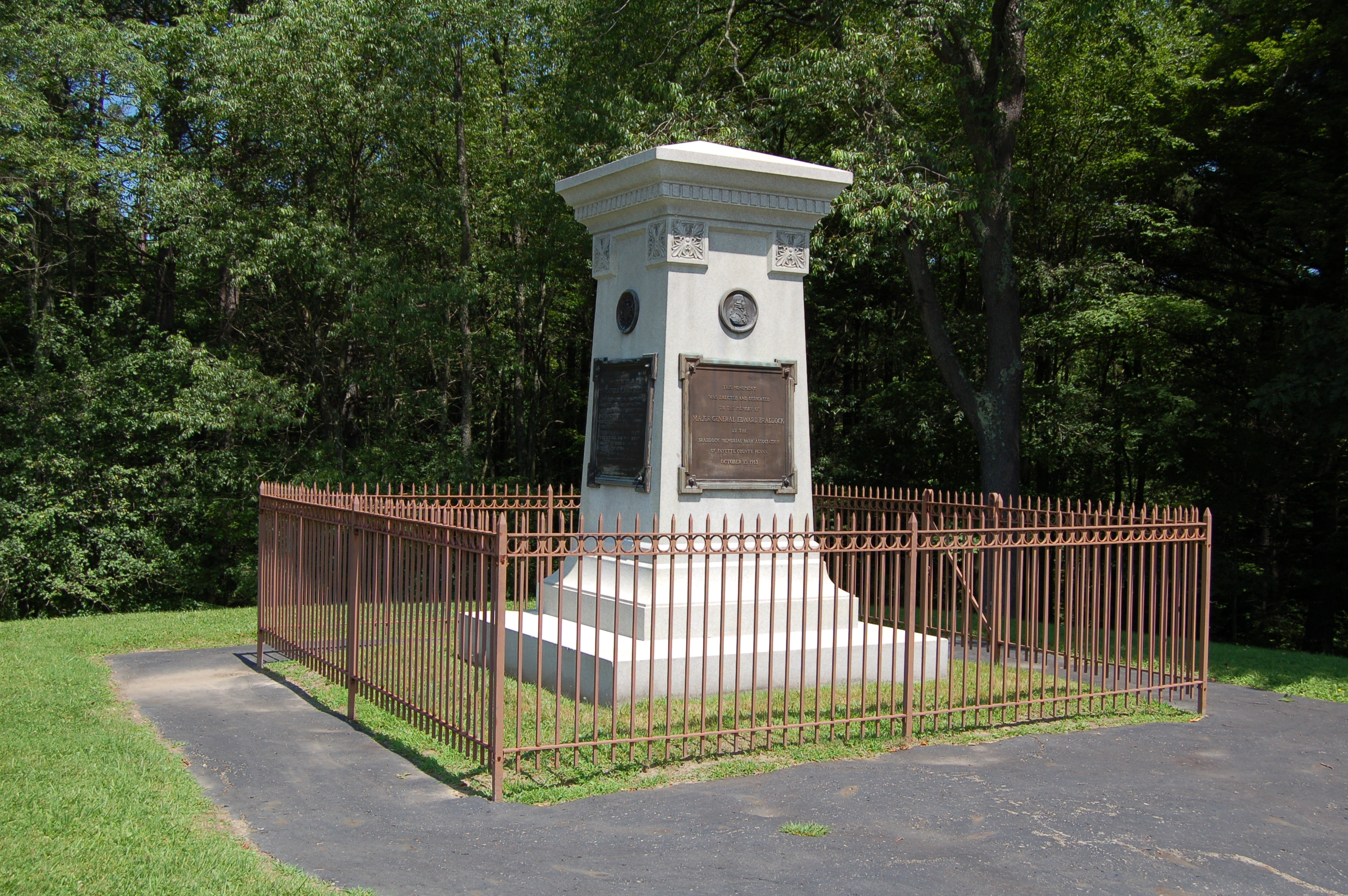
Braddock's grave

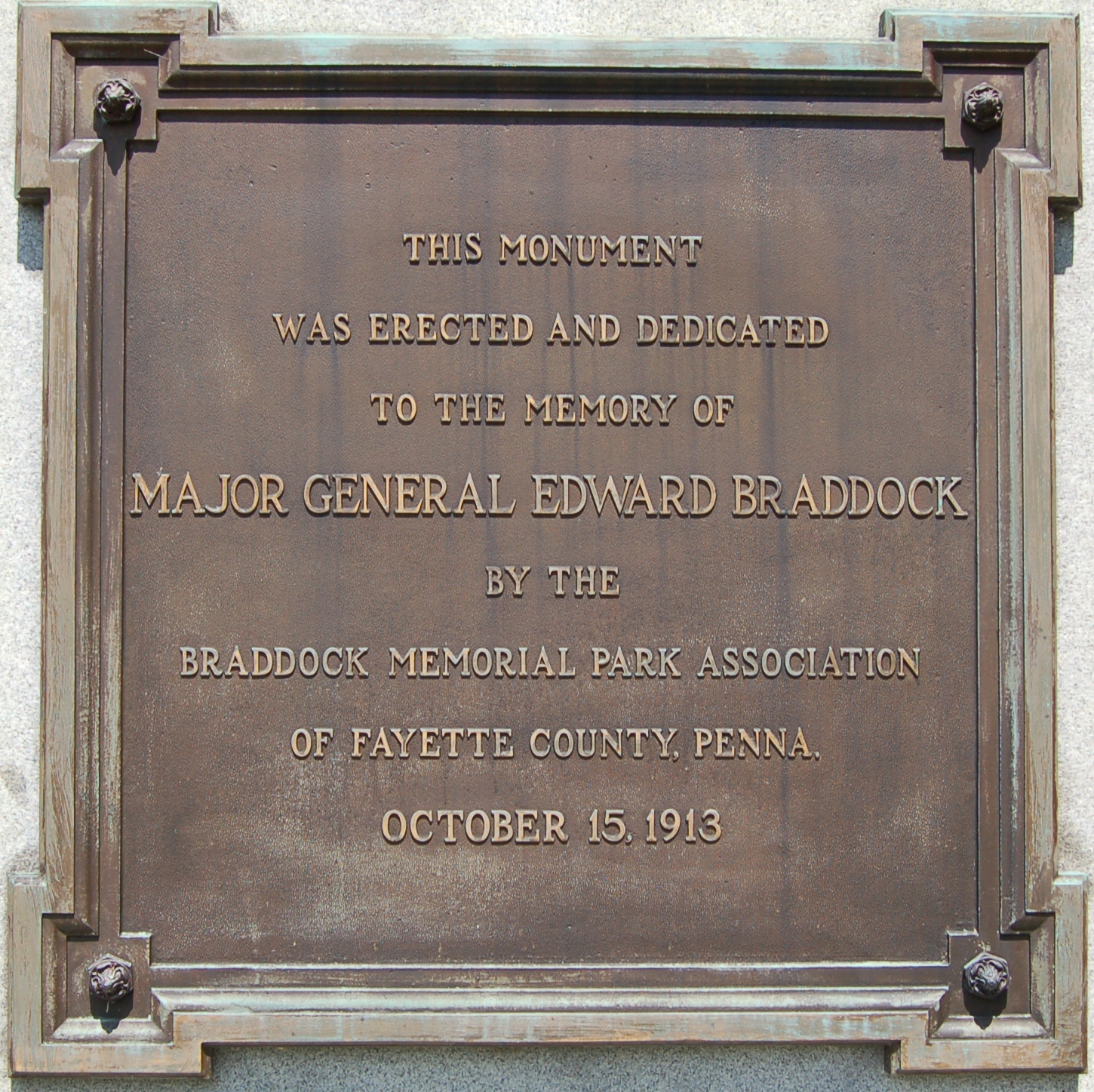
Dedication plaque to Braddock

During the French and Indian War, Braddock was sent to British America to fight against French forces. He landed with two British Army infantry regiments in Hampton, Virginia on 20 February 1755. Braddock met with several colonial governors at the Congress of Alexandria on 14 April and was persuaded to undertake an offensive against the French. The attack would proceed on four fronts: a general from Massachusetts would attack at Fort Niagara, General William Johnson would attack Fort Saint-Frédéric at Crown Point, Colonel Robert Monckton at Fort Beausejour on the Bay of Fundy, while Braddock himself would lead an expedition against Fort Duquesne (now Pittsburgh) at the Forks of the Ohio River.

Braddock had a fatal flaw within his plans. He was used to fighting on an entirely different continent. He failed miserably to adapt to his environment, which at the time, was hardly anything more than wilderness. West of the Atlantic Coast the environment shifted rapidly. Colonists attempted to warn Braddock that his European style fighting methods would not work, but either arrogance or stubbornness prevented him from adapting. Braddock was used to shooting at his enemy with rows of soldiers and rotating positions, using rapid and synchronized fire, having multiple men ready to swap spots while the other reloaded, the idea being that sending a massive spread of bullets was most effective. In dense wilderness, often surrounded by trees, this method had no hope of working. While the British had some skirmish methods, a lack of preparation and being caught by surprise would render that futile. A massive row without coordinated rushing movement, cover tactics, and guerilla style aiming would fail in the wild frontier. Braddock wanted heavy artillery and rows of firing men. However, he had to construct a road to put the artillery on, so the French and Indian enemies were given time to prepare themselves.

After some months of preparation, in which he was hampered by administrative confusion and want of resources previously promised by the colonials, the Braddock expedition took the field with a picked column, in which George Washington served as a volunteer officer. Braddock took some of his men and marched forward, leaving most of his men behind. The column crossed the Monongahela River on 9 July 1755, and shortly afterward collided head-on with an Indian and French force which was rushing from Fort Duquesne to oppose the river crossing. Although the initial exchange of musketry favored the British, felling the French commander and causing some Canadian militia to flee, the remaining Indian/French force reacted quickly. They ran down the flanks of the column and put it under a murderous crossfire. Braddock's methods and commands hardly continued to be effective in the long term of the fight, especially with his environment.

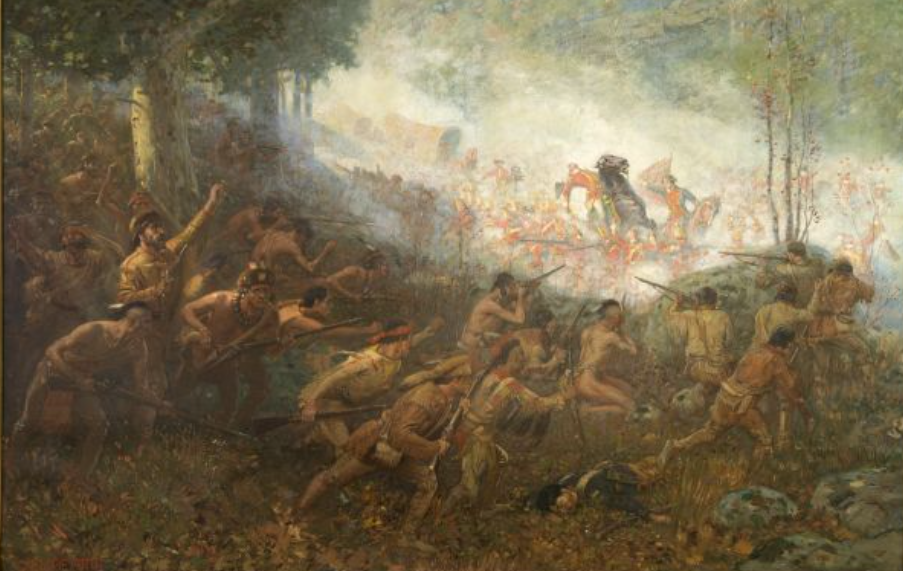
"Braddock's Defeat" by Edwin Deming, 1903, depicting Braddock falling from his horse, and Major George Washington catching its bridle. Wisconsin Historical Society.

Braddock's troops reacted poorly and became disordered. They attempted retreat, but ran into the rest of Braddock's soldiers who had been left behind earlier. Braddock rallied his men repeatedly, but fell at last, mortally wounded by a shot through the chest. Although the exact causes of the defeat are debated to this day, a contributing factor was likely Braddock's underestimation of how effectively the French and Indians could react in a battle situation, and how rapidly the discipline and fighting effectiveness of his own men could evaporate. Arguably the largest factor was his misunderstanding of his techniques and environment. He failed to work with natives, natives who understood fighting in this land much more than he did—not only that but he ignored some intelligence on what the French were doing. His firing rows hit trees. Artillery couldn't be moved fast enough to hit anything other than trees. These were the two things Braddock relied on, and where he battled these things were useless.

Braddock was borne off the field by Washington and Colonel Nicholas Meriwether; he died on 13 July from wounds suffered in the battle. Before he died, Braddock left Washington his ceremonial sash that he wore with his battle uniform, as well as his two pistols. Some of his last words were, "Who would have thought?" and "we shall know better another time". Reportedly, Washington always took this sash with him for the rest of his life, both as the commander of the Continental Army and for his presidential duties. It is still on display today at Washington's home on the Potomac River, Mount Vernon.

Braddock was buried just west of Great Meadows, where the remnants of the column halted on its retreat to reorganize. He was buried in the middle of the road that his men had just cut through and wagons were rolled over top of the grave site to prevent his body from being discovered and desecrated by the Indians. George Washington presided at the burial service, as the chaplain had been severely wounded.

== Legacy ==
Benjamin Franklin's 1791 autobiography includes an account of him helping Braddock garner supplies and carriages for Braddock's troops. Franklin also describes a conversation with Braddock in which he explicitly warned him that his plan to march troops to the fort through a narrow valley would be dangerous because of the possibility of an ambush. This is sometimes cited as advice against the disastrous eventual outcome, but the fact remains that Braddock was not ambushed in that final action, and the battle site was not, in any case, a narrow valley. Braddock had in fact taken great precautions against ambuscade, and had crossed the Monongahela an additional time to avoid the narrow Turtle Creek defile. In 1804, human remains believed to be Braddock's were found buried in the roadway about 1.5 miles (2.4 km) west of Great Meadows by a crew of road workers. The remains were exhumed and moved to a nearby site for reburial. A marble monument was erected over the new grave site in 1913 by the Coldstream Guards.

Braddock is the namesake of Braddock, Braddock Hills, and North Braddock in Pennsylvania; Braddock Heights and Braddock Road in Maryland; and the Braddock Road which runs from Alexandria to Aldie, a separate Braddock Road within Alexandria itself – the namesake of the Metrorail station at its eastern terminus – and Braddock Street in Winchester in Virginia. Sections of the road cut by Braddock's expedition are known as the Braddock Road and form most of eastern U.S. Route 40 in Maryland and Pennsylvania.

== Depictions in media ==
A heavily fictionalized Braddock appears in the 2012 video game Assassin's Creed III, where George Washington is introduced as a young officer serving under him during the French and Indian War. The game portrays Braddock as a ruthless general who indiscriminately kills his enemies, civilians, and even his own allies to achieve his goals. Additionally, he is a former member of the Templar Order and a rival of Haytham Kenway, the playable character during the game's early missions. During his 1755 expedition, he is assassinated by Haytham with the help of several Native American tribes, who sought to see Braddock eliminated because his men had ravaged their villages.

Robert Matzen directed, wrote and produced the documentary When the Forest Ran Red: Washington, Braddock & a Doomed Army, which dramatizes the ambush of Braddock by 250 French soldiers and 600 Native Americans.

The Ohio River expedition is a central event at the start of William Thackeray's novel The Virginians (1857), in which the hero's brother is missing presumed dead. The young George Washington is a central character, and General Braddock is also featured. The novel makes much of Franklin's warnings against the plan, as well as the colonials lack of support for the militia.

Braddock was played by Andy Serkis in the 2026 film Young Washington, depicting his relationship with George Washington and his actions in the Battle of the Monongahela.

== See also ==
- Great Britain in the Seven Years War

Military offices
Preceded by Hon. William Herbert	Colonel of the 14th Regiment of Foot; 1753–1755	Succeeded by Thomas Fowke
New title	Commander-in-Chief, North America; 1755	Succeeded by William Shirley
