= D'Eramo =

D'Eramo (or d'Eramo) is an Italian surname. Notable people with the surname include:

- Francis J. D'Eramo (1959–2009), American judge
- Luce d'Eramo (1925–2001), Italian writer and literary critic
- Michael D'Eramo (born 1999), Italian footballer

== See also ==
- Mirko Eramo
