= Alliquippa =

Alliquippa may refer to:

- Aliquippa, Pennsylvania, a city
- Queen Alliquippa, a leader of the Seneca tribe of American Indians
