= Richard Mann (American football) =

American football coach (born 1947)

Personal information
- Born: April 20, 1947 (age 79); Aliquippa, Pennsylvania, U.S.

Career information
- High school: Aliquippa (Aliquippa)
- College: Arizona State (1965–1968)

Career history
- Aliquippa HS (PA) (1970–1973) Wide receivers coach & defensive backs coach; Arizona State (1974–1979) Wide receivers coach; Louisville (1980–1981) Wide receivers coach; Baltimore Colts (1982–1983) Wide receivers coach; Indianapolis Colts (1984) Wide receivers coach; Cleveland Browns (1985) Wide receivers coach & tight ends coach; Cleveland Browns (1986–1993) Wide receivers coach; New York Jets (1994) Wide receivers coach; New York Jets (1995) Wide receivers coach & tight ends coach; New York Jets (1996) Wide receivers coach; Baltimore Ravens (1997–1998) Wide receivers coach; Kansas City Chiefs (1999–2000) Wide receivers coach; Washington Redskins (2001) Wide receivers coach; Tampa Bay Buccaneers (2002–2008) Wide receivers coach; Tampa Bay Buccaneers (2009) Assistant head coach & wide receivers coach; Pittsburgh Steelers (2013–2017) Wide receivers coach

Awards and highlights
- Super Bowl champion (XXXVII)

Richard Mann (born April 20, 1947) is an American former football coach. He was an assistant coach for the Baltimore Colts, Indianapolis Colts, Cleveland Browns, New York Jets, Baltimore Ravens, Kansas City Chiefs, Washington Redskins, Tampa Bay Buccaneers, and the Pittsburgh Steelers of the National Football League (NFL). He also coached for Aliquippa Junior/Senior High School, Arizona State, and Louisville. He played college football for Arizona State as a halfback and tight end.

== Early life and playing career ==
Mann was raised in Aliquippa, Pennsylvania, where he attended Aliquippa Junior/Senior High School and played football, basketball, and track and field. As a football player, he earned Mid-Western Conference (MWC) and Western Pennsylvania Interscholastic Athletic League (WPIAL) honors. As a senior in 1964, Aliquippa won the WPIAL state championship.

Mann enrolled at Arizona State University where he was initially a halfback for the football team before switching to tight end before his junior year. In his career, he caught 21 passes for 278 yards.

== Coaching career ==
After Mann graduated in 1969, he returned to Aliquippa and his alma mater as the football team's wide receivers coach and defensive backs coach and as the head wrestling coach.

In July 1974, Arizona State athletic director Fred Miller announced Mann as the successor to wide receivers coach Joe McDonald, who had left for another position, effective immediately. In 1980, despite the controversy surrounding Arizona State head coach Frank Kush, Mann was hired as the wide receivers coach for Louisville. Mann was initially hired under Vince Gibson, but Gibson left for Tulane before the season. Despite not technically being officially hired, Mann continued to work with Louisville through spring training and was officially hired in May under new head coach Bob Weber.

In 1982, after two seasons with Louisville, Mann rejoined Kush, this time with the Baltimore Colts of the National Football League (NFL). He stayed with the team during their move to Indianapolis. In 1985, he was hired as the wide receivers coach and tight ends coach for the Cleveland Browns under head coach Marty Schottenheimer. Schottenheimer saw Mann as the answer to the Browns' excessive amount of dropped passes with Mann stating "When you get to this level you should be able to catch the football...When you get into a slump, it's usually a problem with fundamentals. Sometimes you get away from those fundamentals." Mann was also viewed as tedious by players, but his coaching plan included ways to individually make every player better, including the Browns all-time leading receiver, Ozzie Newsome. Mann stayed with Cleveland until 1993, lasting through three different head coaches: Bud Carson, Jim Shofner, and Bill Belichick.

After nine seasons with the Browns, in 1994, Mann was hired as the wide receivers coach for the New York Jets under head coach Pete Carroll, replacing Chip Myers, who was fired alongside the team's former head coach, Bruce Coslet. Mann was instrumental in the success of Rob Moore, who earned his first Pro Bowl honor and the team's first since 1989. When Carroll left the Jets after one season, new head coach Rich Kotite originally was not going to retain Mann, but after Mann decided to remain on the staff, Johnny Roland, who was named wide receivers coach and tight ends coach, shifted to running backs coach, leaving the previous positions open for Mann.
