= Frank Ribar =

American football player (1917–1976)

No. 40
- Positions: Guard, linebacker

Personal information
- Born: January 15, 1915; Wickhaven, Pennsylvania, U.S.
- Died: October 1, 1976 (aged 61); Northampton County, North Carolina, U.S.
- Listed height: 6 ft 1 in (1.85 m)
- Listed weight: 190 lb (86 kg)

Career information
- High school: Aliquippa (Aliquippa, Pennsylvania)
- College: Duke
- NFL draft: 1940: 18th round, 166th overall pick

Career history
- Washington Redskins (1943)

Awards and highlights
- Third-team All-American (1939); First-team All-SoCon (1939)

Career NFL statistics
- Games played: 2
- Stats at Pro Football Reference

Frank Andrew Ribar (born Hribar) (January 15, 1917 – October 1, 1976) was an American professional football guard in the National Football League (NFL) for the Washington Redskins.

== Biography ==
Ribar played high school football at Aliquippa High School, in Aliquippa, Pennsylvania, and college football at Duke University, where he was an All-American and a member of the 1938 Blue Devils team that was unscored upon during regular season (Claassen). He was a member of the Southern team during the 1939 Blue and Gray football game. He also competed in varsity boxing while at Duke (Chanticleer, 1940). He was drafted by the Detroit Lions in the 18th round of the 1940 NFL draft.

He also played for the Norfolk Shamrocks of the Dixie League, and on military teams. He was inducted into the Aliquippa Sports Hall of Fame in 1975, and Beaver County Sports Hall of Fame in 2001.

== Sources ==
- Claassen, H. 1963. Football's Unforgettable Games. Ronald Press.
