= Edward Surratt =

American murderer, rapist and suspected serial killer

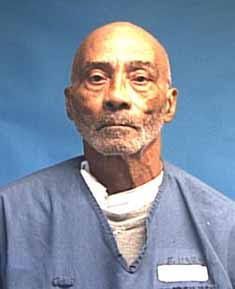
- FLDC Mugshot
- Born: Edward Arthur Surratt; August 8, 1941 (age 85); Aliquippa, Pennsylvania, U.S.
- Convictions: Murder x1 Burglary x1 Assault x4 Rape
- Penalty: Life imprisonment x2 (South Carolina); Life imprisonment x2 plus 200 years imprisonment (Florida)

Details
- Victims: 1–18+
- Span of crimes: 1977–1978
- Country: United States
- States: South Carolina (convicted); Pennsylvania and Ohio (suspected)
- Date apprehended: July 2, 1978
- Imprisoned at: Marion Correctional Institution, Ocala, Florida

Edward Arthur Surratt (born August 8, 1941) is an American murderer, rapist and suspected serial killer. Convicted of a single murder and several rapes in 1978, he remains the prime suspect in a series of murders in Pennsylvania, Ohio and South Carolina between 1977 and 1978. In 2007, after serving 29 years in prison, Surratt confessed to six murders, but no charges were brought against him, despite credible circumstantial evidence indicating that he was indeed the perpetrator. In 2021, he confessed to six more murders.

== Biography ==
Edward Surratt was born on August 8, 1941, in Aliquippa, Pennsylvania, the son of successful entrepreneur Arthur Surratt. He spent his childhood and adolescence in an abusive environment.

Edward attended Aliquippa High School, where he studied up to eighth grade, graduating with honors and most of his friends having a positive opinion of him. However, starting in the ninth grade, he lost interest in studying and began to spend more time on the street, which led him to engaging in crime in the late 1950s. In 1959, he was arrested for disturbing the peace, but escaped with a fine. That same year, due to chronic absenteeism and poor performance, he was kicked out of school, but after being persuaded by his parents, he returned the following year and graduated. After leaving school, Surratt was arrested a second time for disturbing the peace, hitting the arresting officer in the face. He was convicted of assault and sentenced to 14 months imprisonment at SCI Camp Hill Range in Cumberland County.

After his release, and with the financial support of his parents, Edward entered Youngstown University in Ohio, subsequently moving to the state. However, he quickly lost interest in studying, and in 1963, he was expelled and returned to his parents' home. Over the next year, he did odd jobs and engaged in low-skilled labour before being drafted in the Army in March 1964. He served at Fort Dix, New Jersey, where he was disciplined at least twice: for injuring a colleague with a pipe during a fight; and abandoning his post, later being arrested by local police for dangerous driving and illegal weapons possession. Surratt was dismissed from the Army in August 1965 and returned to Aliquippa, where he inherited the business of his late father, who had died in June of that year due to complications from throat cancer. Due to his inexperience and various other circumstances, he went bankrupt, and to escape his monetary difficulties, he enlisted in the Marine Corps in October 1966.

In the spring of 1967, after completing his training, he was sent to Vietnam. As part of a tank battalion, he fought during the Tet Offensive against the Viet Cong. In 1969, during one of the skirmishes, he was wounded in the chest and severely concussed following an explosion, which ruptured his eardrum. Over the next several months, he received treatment at a military hospital, from which he was released in the summer of 1970. In September, Edward was demobilized and returned to the USA. In total, between 1967 and 1970, he took part in a total of 11 military operations, for which he was later awarded the Gallantry Cross and the Purple Heart.

After returning from the war, Surratt married and moved to North Carolina, where he soon found a job as a truck driver. During this period, he began to exhibit antisocial behavior and signs of PTSD. In 1973, he was arrested in Virginia Beach, Virginia on charges of attempting to rape a 13-year-old boy. In March 1974, he was found guilty and convicted. After serving less than four years in prison, Surratt was paroled and released in January 1977, after which he returned to Aliquippa.

== Exposure ==
Edward Surratt came under police suspicion in April 1978. At the time, he was working as a truck driver for a company based in Charlotte, North Carolina, and during his professional career, from 1977 to 1978, he visited cities in both Ohio and Pennsylvania, where a series of at least 27 unsolved murders stirred a moral panic among the population.

He was eventually arrested and interrogated, but denied any responsibility for all the crimes, and since there was no evidence linking Surratt to them, he was released. On June 6, 1978, he was seen in his hometown of Aliquippa in a car that belonged to 66-year-old Luther Langford, who had been killed at his home in western Columbia, South Carolina on June 1 with several blows to the head with a baseball bat. His wife had also been beaten, but she managed to survive. While being arrested, Surratt, in spite of several warning shots, fiercely resisted seven officers and managed to escape, hiding in a nearby metallurgical plant on the Ohio River.

The police conducted a search operation, which ended in vain, after which Surratt was put on a wanted list. While examining the interior of Langford's car, police found a bat with Surratt's fingerprints, as well as a number of items belonging to a 30-year-old disabled Vietnam War veteran Joseph Weinman and his wife, 29-year-old Catherine, who were beaten to death on September 30, 1977, in their Marshall Township, Pennsylvania home. Edward was also among the suspects in the murder of 28-year-old Frank Ziegler, who was shot with a .38-caliber revolver on September 27, a few hundred meters away from the Weinman couple's house; the murders of 34-year-old Richard Hyde and his wife Donna, who were killed with a shotgun at their Moon Township home on December 4; as well as the November 20th murders of 29-year-old William Adams and his wife Nancy in Fallston, Pennsylvania. Adams' corpse was found at his home, while his wife remains missing.

On New Year's Eve, 1977, Surratt was in Breezewood; on that day, 64-year-old Guy Mills, his wife Laura and 36-year-old Joel Krueger were all killed by an assailant with a shotgun. In addition, credit card receipts and a number of other evidence showed that Surratt was in Boardman, Ohio, not far from where another similar murder occurred, making him a prime suspect in the killings altogether.

== Arrest ==
In late June 1978, Surratt travelled to Florida, stopping in rural Vilano Beach. On July 1, he broke into a house and attacked the family of three living there. He beat and terrorized the adults, and sexually violated the couple's 15-year-old daughter. Instead of fleeing the scene of his crime, he got drunk, used drugs, and fell asleep in the bedroom. The victim's father managed to free himself from his bonds and by fleeing the home was able to contact the police. Subsequently, Surratt was arrested at the scene without further incident.

During the course of the investigation, on the basis of material evidence, Edward Surratt was checked for involvement in at least 18 murders, in which the offender had a similar modus operandi to him and the attack in Vilano Beach.

== Trial ==
Surratt's Florida trial began in the fall of 1978, in Volusia County. On September 20, by a jury verdict, he was found guilty of burglary, assault involving rape, and threatening with murder. On October 27, he was sentenced to two life imprisonment terms and an additional 200 years imprisonment. Following this trial, he was extradited to Lexington County, South Carolina, where he was tried for the murder of Langford and the attempted murder of his wife. In the summer of 1979, he was found guilty and was given two additional life imprisonment terms. At his first trial, Surratt confessed to the murder of 56-year-old John Shelkons, who was shot with a shotgun at his home in Baden, Pennsylvania on January 7, 1978, as well as attacking his wife Catherine, who was beaten severely but lived. However, in view of him already being sentenced to long terms of imprisonment, the Beaver County prosecutors refused to prosecute or formally charge Surratt in 1980.

== Aftermath ==
For the rest of his life, Edward Surratt has been housed in various institutions across Florida. On May 8, 1993, during a transfer to a prison in Polk County, he attempted to escape by attacking a police officer and seizing his vehicle, but was prevented from doing so. He was charged with attempted escape, convicted in May 1994 and received an additional 2 years and 6 months imprisonment.

In 2007, Surratt inexplicably confessed to six additional murders: the murders of David and Linda Hamilton, committed on September 20, 1977, in Beaver Township, Mahoning County, Ohio; the murders of 63-year-old John Davis and his 61-year-old wife, Mary, killed with a shotgun in Beaver Township in November 1977. Surratt also claimed to have killed 17-year-old John Feeny, who was shot to death on October 22, 1977, in Findlay Township, Pennsylvania, while trying to meet his 16-year-old fiancée Ranee Gregor. After finding Feeny's body, Gregor was reported missing, with her fate remaining a mystery. According to Surratt, after killing John, he took Ranee hostage and took her to a wooded area, where he threatened to rape her before shooting her in the mouth and burying the body. Edward agreed to indicate Gregor and Hamilton's burial sites, as well as to testify in other murders in exchange for a transfer to a penitentiary in South Carolina, where conditions were much more lenient; his offer was denied, however, and ultimately, no agreement was reached.

In 2021, while imprisoned at Florida State Prison in Raiford, Florida, Surratt confessed to Pennsylvania State Police that he had killed William and Nancy Adams, Guy and Laura Mills, Joel Krueger, and John Shelkons. The Pennsylvania district attorneys in the counties where the murders occurred agreed not to prosecute Surratt due to the life sentences he is already serving.

== See also ==
- List of serial killers in the United States

== Bibliography ==
- Jack Swint (2007). Who Killed...? Pittsburgh, Pa. AuthorHouse. ISBN 978-1600080401.
