= Zuriah Fisher =

American football player (born 2002)

USC Trojans
- Position: Defensive end
- Class: Redshirt Senior

Personal information
- Born: March 20, 2002 (age 24)
- Listed height: 6 ft 3 in (1.91 m)
- Listed weight: 258 lb (117 kg)

Career information
- High school: Aliquippa Junior/Senior (Aliquippa, Pennsylvania)
- College: Penn State (2020–2025); USC (2026–present)
- Stats at ESPN

Zuriah Dupree Fisher (born March 20, 2002) is an American football defensive end for the USC Trojans. He previously played for the Penn State Nittany Lions.

== Early life ==
Fisher attended Aliquippa Junior/Senior High School in Aliquippa, Pennsylvania. Coming out of high school, he committed to play college football for the Penn State Nittany Lions over offers from other schools such as Michigan State and Texas A&M.

== College career ==
After playing one game as a freshman in 2020, Fisher played eight games in 2021, recording four tackles. He only played two games in 2022 due to injury. In 2023, Fisher played in all 13 games, notching 16 tackles, three and a half sacks, and a fumble recovery, before missing the entire 2024 season with an ACL injury. He returned in 2025 as a starter on the Nittany Lion defensive line. That season, Fisher appeared in 11 games, recording 19 tackles with three and a half being for a loss, two sacks, a pass deflection, and a forced fumble, after which he entered the NCAA transfer portal.
