= Jon Baldwin =

American football player (born 1989)

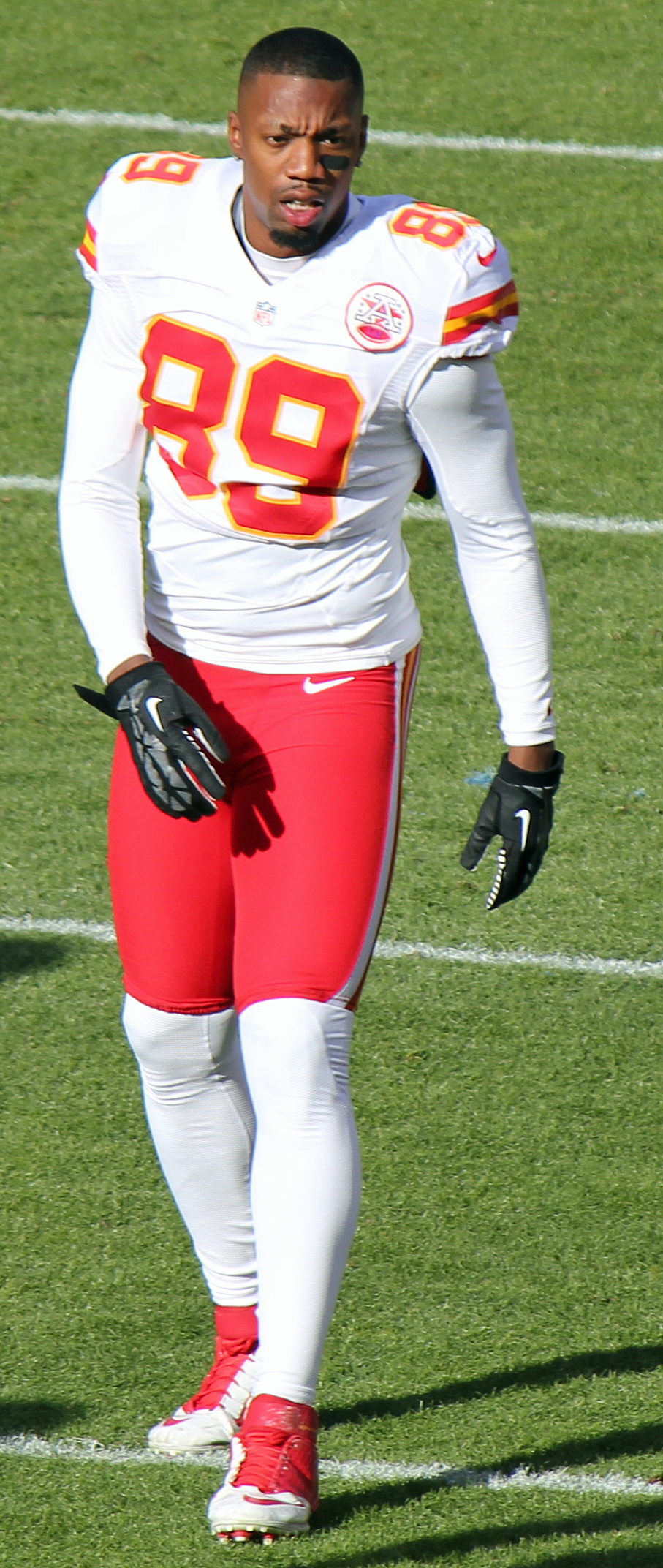
- Baldwin with the Kansas City Chiefs in 2012

No. 84, 89
- Position: Wide receiver

Personal information
- Born: August 10, 1989 (age 37); Aliquippa, Pennsylvania, U.S.
- Listed height: 6 ft 4 in (1.93 m)
- Listed weight: 230 lb (104 kg)

Career information
- High school: Aliquippa (PA)
- College: Pittsburgh (2008–2010)
- NFL draft: 2011: 1st round, 26th overall pick

Career history
- Kansas City Chiefs (2011–2012); San Francisco 49ers (2013); Detroit Lions (2014)*
- * Offseason or practice squad member only

Awards and highlights
- 2009 Rivals All-American (third team); 2009 First Team All-Big East; 2009 Big East All-Academic Football Team

Career NFL statistics
- Receptions: 44
- Receiving yards: 607
- Receiving average: 13.8
- Receiving touchdowns: 2
- Stats at Pro Football Reference

Jonathan Dupree Baldwin (born August 10, 1989) is an American former professional football player who was a wide receiver in the National Football League (NFL). He was selected by the Kansas City Chiefs in the first round of the 2011 NFL draft. He played college football at Pittsburgh. Baldwin also played for the San Francisco 49ers.

== Early life ==
Baldwin attended Aliquippa High School in Aliquippa, Pennsylvania, where he was one of the country's most elite receiver prospects and a multi-sport (basketball and track and field) star. In football, he was a SuperPrep All-American and was the Northeast Offensive Player of the Year. He was selected to the Pittsburgh Post-Gazette "Fabulous 22", to the Pittsburgh Tribune-Review "Terrific 25" and to the Harrisburg Patriot-News "Platinum 33." He compiled 62 catches for 1,083 yards (17.5 avg.) and 14 touchdowns his final two years, helping his team to a combined 19-4 record (.826), including berths in the WPIAL Class AA playoffs each season. He earned a combined eight varsity letters at Aliquippa High, including four in basketball, three in football and three in track. Academically, he had a 3.35 GPA. He was also selected to play in the 2008 U.S. Army All-American Bowl.

In addition to being a national football recruit, Baldwin also had several Division I scholarship offers in basketball, including Marquette. He was an All-state performer, averaging 21.9 points, 8.6 rebounds and two blocks a game his senior year. He was teammates with fellow Pitt wide receiver Mike Shanahan.

Also a standout track & field athlete, Baldwin competed in relays and sprints his junior and senior seasons. At the 2008 Midwestern Athletic Conference, he took second in the 200 meters, crossing the finish line at 22.07 seconds. He tied for first place in the 100 meters at the 2008 WPIAL AA/AAA Qualifiers, recording a career-best time of 10.70 seconds. At the PIAA T&F State Championships, he took bronze in the 100 meters, with a time of 10.94 seconds. In addition, he was also a member of the Quips' PIAA and WPIAL champion 4 × 100 m relay teams, that recorded a school-record of 42.47 seconds.

Regarded as a five-star recruit by Rivals.com, Baldwin was ranked as the No. 5 wide receiver in the nation, the No. 26 prospect in the nation and the No. 2 best player in the state of Pennsylvania. He was rated one of the country's top 40 overall prospects by Scout.com (No. 20) and PrepStar.com (No. 38). Among national receiver prospects, he was rated No. 3 by SuperPrep, No. 5 by Rivals and No. 6 by Scout. He was named to The Associated Press Pennsylvania Class AA All-State Team (first-team), and was No. 3 on Scout's East Top 100 list.

== College career ==
Baldwin played for the University of Pittsburgh. As a true freshman in 2008, Baldwin started 3 of 13 games, recording 18 receptions for 404 yards and three touchdowns.

During his sophomore season in 2009 he made 54 receptions for 1,080 yards and eight touchdowns in the regular season. including six catches for 113 yards and two touchdowns against Cincinnati in the final game with the conference championship on the line, but Pittsburgh lost by one point.

Heading into the 2010 season, Lindy's listed him as the nation's No. 3 wide receiver and a second-team All-American while the Sporting News listed Baldwin as a third-team preseason All-American. In 2010, he had 55 receptions, 822 yard and five touchdowns in 13 games.

== Professional career ==
Pre-draft measurables
Height	Weight	Arm length	Hand span	Wingspan	40-yard dash	10-yard split	20-yard split	20-yard shuttle	Three-cone drill	Vertical jump	Broad jump	Bench press
6 ft 4 3/8 in (1.94 m)	228 lb (103 kg)	33 5/8 in (0.85 m)	10 1/8 in (0.26 m)	6 ft 7 7/8 in (2.03 m)	4.52 s	1.59 s	2.66 s	4.34 s	7.07 s	42 in (1.07 m)	10 ft 9 in (3.28 m)	20 reps
All values from NFL Combine

=== Kansas City Chiefs ===
Baldwin was selected with the 26th overall pick in the 2011 NFL draft by the Kansas City Chiefs. He was expected to be the second WR on the roster behind Dwayne Bowe. On July 29, 2011, he signed a 4-year deal with the Chiefs. In week 2 of the 2011 NFL preseason Baldwin suffered a wrist injury after a locker room fight with teammate Thomas Jones that sidelined him for the rest of the 2011 preseason. Baldwin caught his first NFL catch against the Raiders on week 7 for 14 yards. On October 31, 2011, Baldwin played in his first game at Arrowhead Stadium as he played a key role in the Chiefs 23-20 victory over the San Diego Chargers. Baldwin caught 5 passes for 82 yards as well as catching his first career NFL touchdown on a 39-yard pass from Matt Cassel. Baldwin would finish the year with 254 receiving yards and one touchdown.

=== San Francisco 49ers ===
On August 19, 2013, Baldwin was traded to the San Francisco 49ers in exchange for WR A. J. Jenkins. He was waived on August 3, 2014.

=== Detroit Lions ===
On August 4, 2014, Baldwin was claimed by the Detroit Lions, but was waived the following day after failing a physical.

== Personal life ==
Baldwin has two sisters, and is the son of Jeffrey Baldwin. His father was a defensive lineman at Pitt from 1981 to 1984. His cousin, Charles Fisher, played cornerback in the NFL for the Cincinnati Bengals.
