= Kanuksusy =

Seneca liaison and messenger

Kanuksusy or Kos Showeyha (c. 1701-November 1756) was a member of the Seneca tribe and son of Seneca chieftain Queen Alliquippa. He acted as a liaison between the Ohio Seneca and the Pennsylvania Colony during the French and Indian War as well as an intermediary and messenger for the Six Nations among other Native American tribes during the early part of the 18th century.

Known to the English as Captain Newcastle and Colonel Fairfax, Kanuksusy held numerous names among various other Native American tribes including Canachquasy, Cashuwayon, Ah Knoyis, Kosshoweyha, Cashiowaya and Cashunyon.

== Biography ==
Although much of his early life is unknown, he was born to Queen Alliquippa of the Mingo Seneca and presumably grew up along the three rivers (the Ohio River, the Allegheny River, and the Monongahela River) near present-day Pittsburgh, Pennsylvania.

He is first recorded as Canachquasy, the leader of a band of ten young Mingo warriors whom he led from Kuskusky to Philadelphia arriving in the city on November 11, 1747. Delivering news of French activities in western Pennsylvania, the first reports to be heard from outside the colony, he later addressed the Pennsylvania Council that he and his group were representatives of the "Six Nations" and confirmed its neutrality during King George's War which had earlier been decided at the Onondaga Council. After leaving the capital, he spent the winter living with the Nanticoke tribe at the mouth of the Juniata River.

In November 1753, his name was listed as one of the Mohawk chieftains "now entrusted with the conduct of public affairs among the Six Nations". As allies of the British, he accompanied his mother to travel with a group of Mingo Seneca to Fort Necessity to assist George Washington. While staying with Washington in June 1754, his mother requested that he might let her son be taken into Council given her failing health. Calling his Native American allies, Kanuksusy was presented with a medal which Washington asked him "to wear it in remembrance of his great father, the King of England" and was named Colonel Fairfax after the Virginia colonist Thomas Fairfax. He was told this signified, "the First in Council".

Although neither he nor his mother participated in the Battle of the Great Meadows on July 3-4, during a meeting of the Philadelphia Council he was personally commended by Governor Robert Hunter Morris as one of seven Native American chieftains who fought under General Edward Braddock at the Battle of the Monongahela the following year. He was, however, critical of Braddock's actions during the battle commenting on "the pride and ignorance of that great General that came from England. He is now dead; but he was a bad man when he was alive; he looked upon us as dogs, and would never hear anything that was said to him. We often endeavored to advise him and to tell him of the danger he was in with his Soldiers; but he never appeared pleased with us, & that was the reason that a great many of our Warriors left him & would not be under his Command."

On August 22, 1754, Kanuksusy led a delegation to the Pennsylvania state house where he met with Governor Morris and members of the provincial council as well as Andrew Montour, Conrad Weiser and other intermediaries to discuss, among other issues, the defeat of General Edward Braddock by a combined force of French and Native Americans the previous month and efforts to enlist the aid of Native American allies. During this meeting, he was honored by the British for his services and received "an English name" from Governor Morris who stated.

In January 1756, while at another council meeting in Carlisle with Governor Morris, he was "adopted" by the Iroquois as a colonial messenger and given the name Ah Knoyis. He and Teedyuscung were appointed by the Philadelphia council as official agents regarding Indian transactions for the colony on July 20.

Living among the hostile tribes of the Upper Susquehanna for a year, he acted as a messenger and spy for Governor Morris before returning to Philadelphia where he died from smallpox in November 1756.
