= Darrelle Revis =

American football player (born 1985)

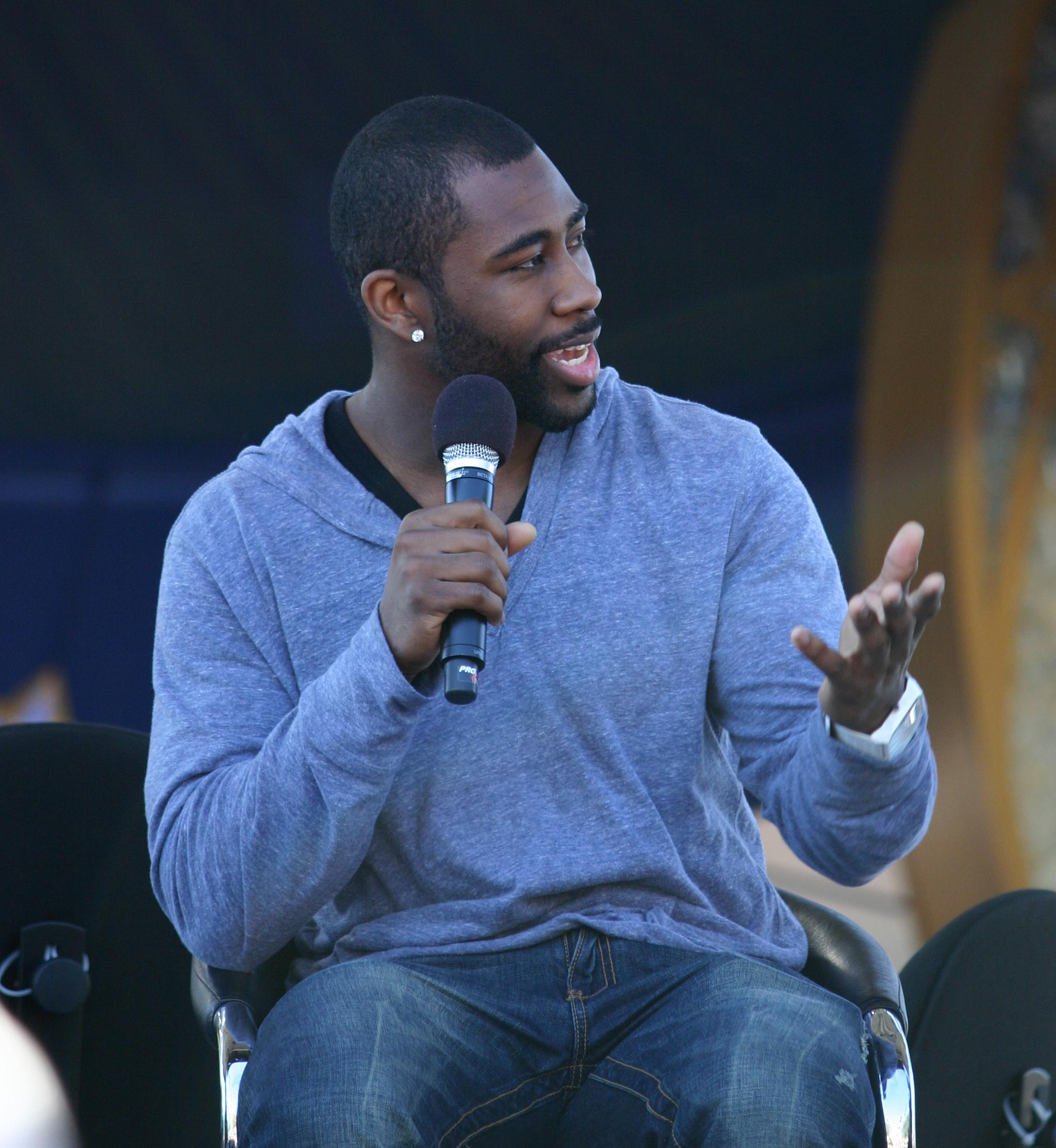
- Revis in 2010

No. 24
- Position: Cornerback

Personal information
- Born: July 14, 1985 (age 41); Aliquippa, Pennsylvania, U.S.
- Listed height: 5 ft 11 in (1.80 m)
- Listed weight: 198 lb (90 kg)

Career information
- High school: Aliquippa (PA)
- College: Pittsburgh (2004–2006)
- NFL draft: 2007: 1st round, 14th overall pick

Career history
- New York Jets (2007–2012); Tampa Bay Buccaneers (2013); New England Patriots (2014); New York Jets (2015–2016); Kansas City Chiefs (2017)

Awards and highlights
- Super Bowl champion (XLIX); 4× First-team All-Pro (2009–2011, 2014); 7× Pro Bowl (2008–2011, 2013–2015); NFL 2010s All-Decade Team; PFWA All-Rookie Team (2007); New York Jets Ring of Honor; 2× First-team All-Big East (2005, 2006)

Career NFL statistics
- Total tackles: 497
- Forced fumbles: 6
- Fumble recoveries: 10
- Pass deflections: 139
- Interceptions: 29
- Defensive touchdowns: 3
- Stats at Pro Football Reference
- Pro Football Hall of Fame

Darrelle Shavar Revis (born July 14, 1985) is an American former professional football cornerback who played in the National Football League (NFL) for 11 seasons. A member of the New York Jets for most of his career, Revis is considered one of the greatest cornerbacks of all time. Due to his prowess and ability to shut down the best receiver of opposing teams, his spot on the field was nicknamed "Revis Island".

Revis played college football for the Pittsburgh Panthers and was selected in the first round in the 2007 NFL draft by the Jets, where he spent eight non-consecutive seasons. He also played one season each for the Tampa Bay Buccaneers, New England Patriots, and Kansas City Chiefs. During his career, he was named to seven Pro Bowls and four-time first-team All-Pros, and won Super Bowl XLIX with the Patriots. He was inducted to the Pro Football Hall of Fame in 2023.

== Early life ==
Revis attended Aliquippa High School in Aliquippa, Pennsylvania. His high school accolades included Pittsburgh Tribune-Review 2003 Player of the Year, Pittsburgh Post-Gazette 2003 WPIAL Class AA Player of the Year, and 2003 Pittsburgh Post-Gazette “Fabulous 22”.

In the Pennsylvania Interscholastic Athletic Association Class AA State Championship football game, he led Aliquippa to a come-from-behind 32–27 win over Northern Lehigh by scoring five touchdowns, including three rushing touchdowns, a punt return, and the return of a blocked Northern Lehigh field goal attempt. He also completed a 39-yard pass, had a reception, and an interception in the game.

In his junior and senior years of high school, Revis led Aliquippa to Western Pennsylvania Interscholastic Athletic League (WPIAL) basketball championships, leading the team in scoring both years, culminating with a 25.2 PPG average his senior season. He also had the most interceptions out of any cornerback in high school. In track & field, Revis ran on the Quips' WPIAL Class AA champion 4 × 100 metres relay team that placed third at the state championships.

== College career ==
Revis attended the University of Pittsburgh, and played for the Pittsburgh Panthers football team. He earned first-team freshman All-America honors his 2004 freshman campaign. Revis played all 12 games, and started 11 of those 12. Revis tied for fifth on the team with 49 tackles, tied for team lead with 12 broken-up passes, and second on the team with 14 defended passes. Revis also had two interceptions. The most important of the two interceptions was against the West Virginia Mountaineers, when he intercepted a late pass that set up the Panthers' game-winning drive. Revis also had a career-high seven tackles against the Boston College Eagles. With Pitt leading 17–10, the Boston College Eagles elected to go for it late in the fourth on fourth-and-goal. The pass got to the one-yard line, but Revis hit the receiver and stopped him from getting the score.

Revis's sophomore season in 2005 was another excellent campaign. Revis earned first-team All-Big East at cornerback. Revis led the Panthers with four interceptions and was second on the team with 13 defended passes. Revis was ranked second in the Big East with two recovered fumbles. Revis had a 79-yard punt return for a score against the Cincinnati Bearcats, and blocked a field goal against the Connecticut Huskies which was returned for the score. Revis also had an interception and totaled 119 punt return yards against the Rutgers Scarlet Knights.

Revis's final year at Pitt, his 2006 junior campaign, was where he established himself on the national stage. He was a candidate for the Jim Thorpe Award and Bronko Nagurski Trophy at the end of the season. Revis recorded interceptions against the Virginia Cavaliers and Cincinnati, which were both taken back for touchdowns.

During the 2006 Backyard Brawl game with rival West Virginia, Revis made a dynamic, 73-yard punt return, while breaking several tackles, and finally scoring a touchdown late in the second quarter. The key block to spring him, by Pitt wide receiver Derek Kinder, took out two Mountaineers. The play was nominated for "Best Play" at the 2007 ESPY Awards and was voted the best College Football Play of the Year.

== Professional career ==
=== Pre-draft ===
On January 10, 2007, Revis announced he would forgo his senior year at Pittsburgh to enter the 2007 NFL draft. He was considered one of the top three cornerbacks available, along with Leon Hall of Michigan and Aaron Ross of Texas, and was one of 30 drafted. He received an invitation to the NFL Scouting Combine however, he participated in meetings with NFL teams but was unable to show his skills during drills due to suffering a strained hamstring. Revis impressed scouts at Pittsburgh's Pro Day, impressing them with his 40-yard dash, a main concern scouts had prior to him completing the test. Teryl Austin, the Arizona Cardinals' defensive backs coach at the time stated, "nobody went away disappointed." Revis was touted by ESPN analyst Len Pasquarelli as having "terrific coverage techniques".

Pre-draft measurables
Height	Weight	Arm length	Hand span	40-yard dash	10-yard split	20-yard split	20-yard shuttle	Three-cone drill	Vertical jump	Broad jump	Bench press
5 ft 11 1/2 in (1.82 m)	204 lb (93 kg)	32 1/2 in (0.83 m)	8 1/4 in (0.21 m)	4.38 s	1.46 s	2.49 s	4.08 s	6.56 s	38.0 in (0.97 m)	10 ft 5 in (3.18 m)	16 reps
All values from Pittsburgh's Pro Day (March 16, 2007), except measurables and bench press from NFL Combine

=== New York Jets (first stint) ===
New York Jets scout Terry Bradway was impressed by Revis' workout but was concerned by the level of competition Pittsburgh played, as Louisville's Mario Urrutia was the toughest receiver Revis faced during the season. Despite this concern, the organization was so impressed by his man and zone coverage techniques and his ability to play the run that they decided to trade up for him in the draft. Originally, New York discussed trading draft selections with the Houston Texans who had the 10th overall pick; however, when the deal fell through, they traded their first, second and fifth round picks to the Carolina Panthers, moving from 25th overall to 14th overall, to select Revis.

Revis missed the first 21 days of training camp while his agents negotiated a contract. At one point, Revis' mother was flown in from Pittsburgh to help expedite the negotiation process. On August 15, 2007, the Jets came to an agreement with Revis. The 47-page contract was worth approximately $36 million over five years according to ESPN writer John Clayton.

==== Rookie season ====
Head coach Eric Mangini expected Revis to contribute immediately citing his abilities on defense and special teams. He likened Revis' talents to that of Ty Law, who was once described as a "shutdown" cornerback. Revis made his preseason debut against the New York Giants on August 25, 2007, after less than a week of practice. In his debut, he recorded five tackles and one pass defended against receiver Sinorice Moss and had one punt return for 13 yards. Revis was named the starting cornerback for the Jets at the end of the preseason, becoming the first Jets rookie cornerback to start since Ray Mickens in 1996.

In his first game against the New England Patriots, Revis recorded 7 tackles and held Wes Welker to 6 catches for 61 yards in the 38–14 loss. He recorded the first interception of his career against the division-rival Buffalo Bills during their week 8 matchup. Revis would show great progression throughout the season, remaining as the Jets' solid starter and one of their best defensive players. Starting all 16 games, Revis ended his rookie season with 87 total tackles, one sack, one forced fumble, and 3 interceptions. Revis made the PFWA 2007 All-Rookie Team during his rookie campaign.

==== 2008 season ====
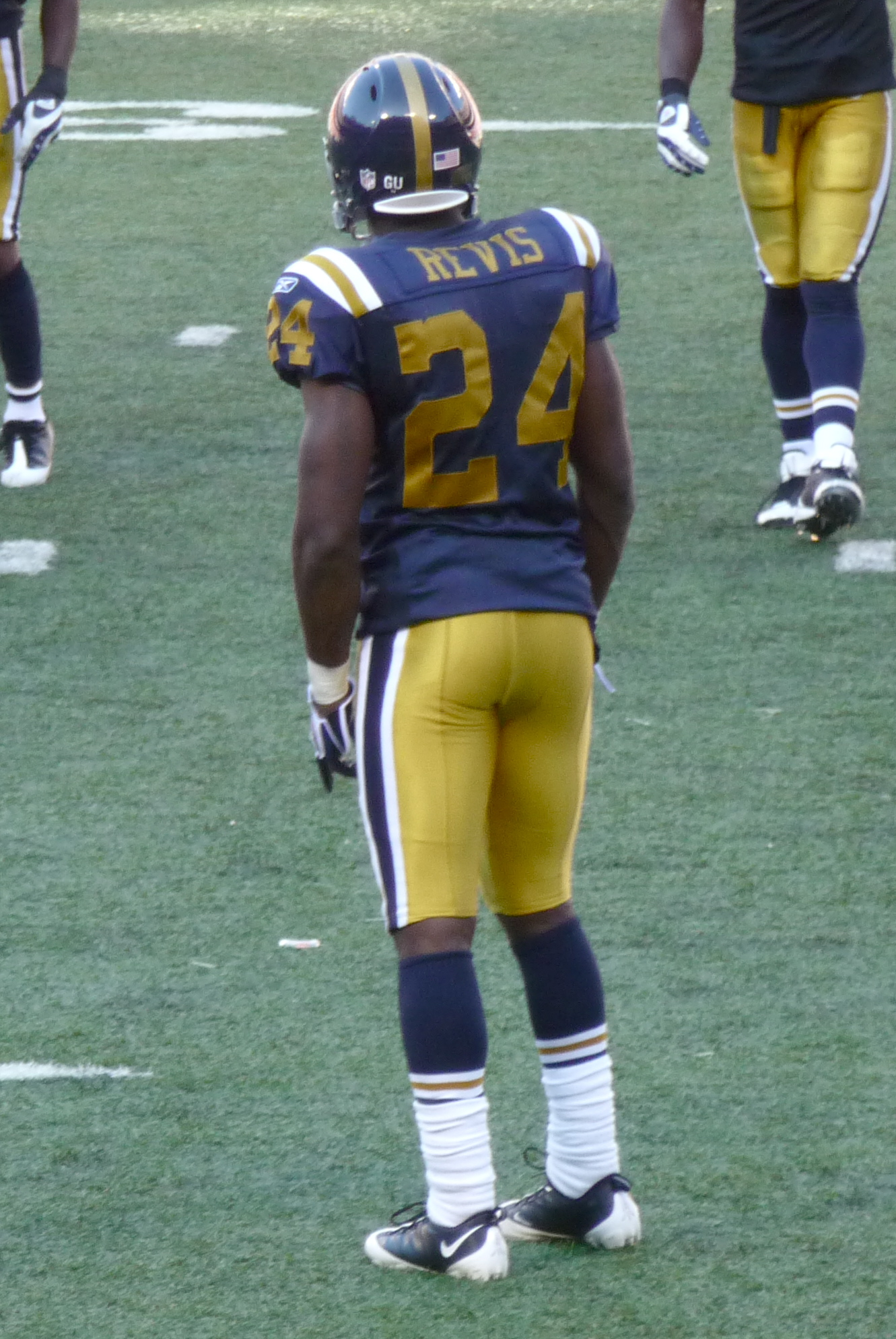
Revis in 2008 wearing a NY Jets throwback uniform.

The Jets opened the season with a match-up against the Miami Dolphins. Revis, the established starter, intercepted former Jet Chad Pennington's pass in the end zone with five seconds remaining in the game to preserve the Jets' 20–14 victory. A week later, Revis held Patriots wide receiver Randy Moss to two catches for 22 yards. Mangini praised Revis' attention to detail and perfecting the flaws of his game. The following week, the Jets faced the Arizona Cardinals with wide receivers Larry Fitzgerald and Anquan Boldin. He intercepted two Kurt Warner passes, one of which he returned 32 yards for a touchdown, the first of his NFL career.

Despite his performance alongside All-Pro safety Kerry Rhodes, the Jets' pass defense was ranked 28th which prompted coach Eric Mangini to sign free agent All-Pro cornerback and former New York Jet Ty Law in November. Though the addition of Law was made to bolster the Jets' pass defense, the pass defense continued to struggle and would rank 29th overall by season's end in spite of Revis' positive performance. Revis' side of the field was known not to be tested as teams instead chose to attack rookie cornerback Dwight Lowery.

For his efforts, Revis was elected to the 2009 Pro Bowl. During the Pro Bowl, Revis intercepted a pass intended for Anquan Boldin with one hand.

==== 2009 season ====
Revis has become the NFL's preeminent lockdown cornerback, drawing comparisons to Deion Sanders and Rod Woodson and propelling the Jets' defense to the top of the charts.

— Tim Graham, ESPN.

Revis started off the 2009 season matched up against some of football's best wide receivers. In week 1, he helped limit Houston Texans Pro-bowler Andre Johnson to four receptions for 35 yards. Revis later faced Tom Brady and the New England Patriots, when he matched up against another Pro-bowl receiver, Randy Moss, and limited him to four receptions and 24 yards after catching 14 passes for 141 yards the week prior. Revis also had an interception against Brady, helping the Jets defense to be the first team since 2006 to stop the Patriots from scoring a touchdown. In week 11 Revis held Moss to limited yards although he did give up a touchdown to Moss. Week 5 against the Miami Dolphins was the only other blemish on Revis’ season, as he was beaten by wide receiver Ted Ginn Jr. for a 53-yard touchdown reception on Monday Night Football, during the Jets 31–27 week 5 loss to the Dolphins.

Former Jets head coach Rex Ryan stated on several occasions that he thinks Revis is the "best" cornerback in the NFL, and that he is also the best cornerback he's worked with, in all of his years of coaching defenses. NFL Total Access ranked him as the No. 3 cornerback in the league on a Best In The Biz list before the '09 season kicked off. Deion Sanders also said "Revis is going to be the best corner in the game for years."

Revis ended the year winning a Pro Bowl spot, and earned major respect inside and outside the league. In week 17 (the NFL's last regular season week), he locked up Cincinnati Bengals receiver Chad Ochocinco, preventing Ochocinco from making a single reception, in part because a win would not advance Cincinnati to a higher playoff seed, and also because Ochocinco left the game with an injured knee. The Jets won the game 37–0, their second shutout, and third 'defensive' shutout. The victory qualified the Jets for the postseason, and the two teams met up again six days later in the first round. During the Jets' 24–14 victory over the Bengals, Revis again shut down Ochocinco, limiting him to two catches for 28 yards and collecting an interception.

This, in my opinion, was the best year a corner has ever had, the most impact a corner has ever had in the National Football League. That's my opinion. Apparently, that wasn't how everybody felt. A number that I think would be interesting would be eight, and no, that’s not the amount of touchdown passes that Green Bay (Woodson's team) gave up against Arizona. That is the number of touchdown passes we gave up all season, and the biggest reason for that is Darrelle Revis.

— Rex Ryan

In the second week of the playoffs, Revis and the Jets defeated the AFC's #2 seed San Diego Chargers, 17–14. Since the Chargers had a large variety of well acclaimed receivers, Revis was forced to cover most of them, yet San Diego quarterback Philip Rivers only threw the ball to a receiver covered by Revis three times during the entire game. Two of the three were tipped away by Revis for an incomplete pass, and the third was an interception. His interception was made diving to the ground to catch a ball that was deflected off the shoe of Chargers' wide receiver Vincent Jackson. Revis' interception changed the momentum of the game and was instrumental in the Jets' 17–14 victory. The win led the Jets to the AFC Championship game against the Indianapolis Colts, their first trip to the AFC Championship since 1998. The Jets lost 30–17, due to a lack of scoring in the second half (0 points), and poor secondary playing, with the exception of Revis himself, who only allowed 2 receptions.

Revis lost in the Defensive Player of the Year voting to Charles Woodson, 28–14.

==== 2010 season ====
Revis missed the majority of training camp and all four of the team's preseason contests while holding out for a new contract. He was to receive approximately $1 million in the fourth year of a six-year contract. On September 5, an agreement was reached on a four-year $32 million guaranteed contract, and Revis subsequently reported to camp the next day, a week before the team's season opener.

During the team's week 2 matchup against the New England Patriots, after getting beaten for a deep touchdown by Randy Moss, Revis left the game with what was later revealed to be a strained hamstring. Revis would miss two weeks of the season. Revis reaggravated the hamstring following the team's matchup against the Minnesota Vikings. On October 17, 2010, Revis was activated two hours prior to kickoff against the Denver Broncos and started the game. The Jets headed into a bye week following their victory over Denver thus allowing Revis to rehab his hamstring. Revis has since declared himself to be 100 percent.

During the 2011 AFC Wild Card Round, Revis held Indianapolis Colts wide receiver Reggie Wayne to one catch for a yard in a victory over the Colts. The Jets went on to defeat the New England Patriots in the Divisional Round but would lose to the Pittsburgh Steelers in the AFC Championship. Revis finished the year with 32 tackles but did not record an interception in 13 games. He was ranked eighth by his fellow players on the NFL Top 100 Players of 2011.

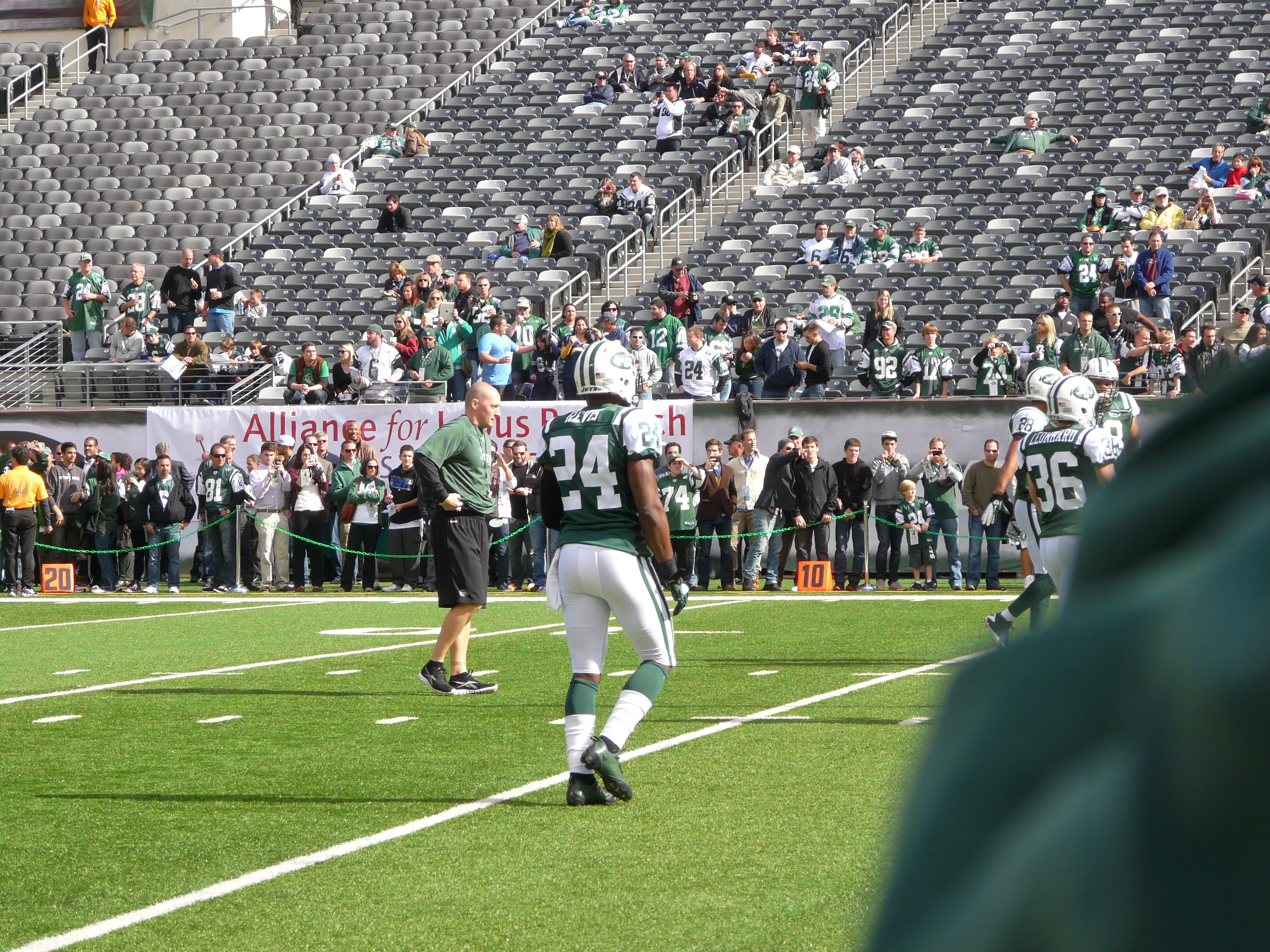
Revis with the Jets in 2011.

==== 2011 season ====
The Jets opened their 2011 season against the Dallas Cowboys on September 11, 2011. The game was played at MetLife Stadium on Sunday Night Football on the ten-year anniversary of the September 11 attacks. The Jets were tied with the Cowboys 24–24 in the final minutes when Revis intercepted a Tony Romo pass intended for Dez Bryant to put the Jets in field goal range. Nick Folk converted the game-winning field goal to give the Jets the win 27–24. In week 6, the Jets were playing the Dolphins with a 2–3 record in what some considered a must win game. Revis intercepted a pass intended for Brandon Marshall and ran it back 100 yards for a touchdown on October 17, 2011, tying the longest interception return in Jets history, first set by Aaron Glenn in 1996. Later in the same game against the Miami Dolphins, he intercepted another Matt Moore pass in the fourth quarter to preserve the Jets' victory with a score of 24–6. On Sunday, October 23, 2011, the Jets were playing the San Diego Chargers. In the fourth quarter, the Jets were down 21–17 and the Chargers had the ball in Jets territory when Darrelle Revis intercepted a pass intended for Vincent Jackson which was deflected right into the hands of Revis. Later on in the drive Mark Sanchez would complete a touchdown pass to Plaxico Burress, his 3rd of the game. The Jets would win 27–21. After 13 games, the Jets were 8–5 going on a 3-game winning streak and looking to make the playoffs for 3 straight years. But the Jets would lose their next 3 games and miss the playoffs by 1 game with a record of 8–8. After the season it came out that the Jets locker room was having problems. Revis ended the year with 52 tackles and 4 interceptions and was elected to his fourth Pro Bowl and third All-Pro team. He was ranked fifth by his fellow players on the NFL Top 100 Players of 2012.

==== 2012 season ====
Revis entered the 2012 season hinting that he may not attend training camp, with the hope of reworking his contract. Despite the uncertainty regarding his contract status, Revis attended training camp. The Jets' season opener was played against the Buffalo Bills on September 9, 2012. Revis intercepted a Ryan Fitzpatrick pass which set up a Mark Sanchez touchdown on the ensuing drive. The Jets would go on to defeat the Bills 48–28. Revis recorded five tackles in addition to the interception but was taken out of the game in the fourth quarter after teammate Bart Scott accidentally hit Revis in the head with his knee while Revis was still on the ground. Revis was diagnosed with a mild concussion and subsequently ruled out for week 2 against the Pittsburgh Steelers. He returned the following week against the Miami Dolphins where he recovered a fumble but later left the game with an undisclosed knee injury. An MRI taken the following day revealed Revis suffered a torn anterior cruciate ligament (ACL) and would be out for the remainder of the season. He was placed on injured reserve on October 12, 2012. He was ranked 67th by his fellow players on the NFL Top 100 Players of 2013.

=== Tampa Bay Buccaneers ===
On April 21, 2013, Revis was traded to the Tampa Bay Buccaneers in exchange for the Buccaneers' 2013 first round pick (13th overall, used on Sheldon Richardson) and a 2014 fourth round conditional pick, which could become a third round pick.

Going to Tampa is great. I look at it as a new chapter in my football career. The organization is great. It’s real laid back down there. It’s not a lot of pressure as it is in New York.

— Darrelle Revis

Revis flew a private jet to travel to Tampa, Florida for an official physical. After being examined by team doctors, including head team orthopedist John Zvijac and director of sports medicine Todd Toriscelli, Revis was deemed healthy.

The Jets gave Revis permission to visit the Buccaneers on Sunday morning after reaching an agreement with Tampa Bay on the transaction. Revis was successful in getting one of the biggest contracts in the NFL, in line with other elite players such as defensive end Mario Williams (six years, $96 million), wide receivers Calvin Johnson (eight years, $132 million) and Larry Fitzgerald (eight years, $113 million) received. Revis' 6-year deal was worth $96 million, making him the highest paid defensive back in NFL history, however there was no guaranteed money included.

Revis made his debut with the Buccaneers on September 8, 2013, playing against his former team, the New York Jets. He had his first interception as a Buccaneer on September 29, against the Arizona Cardinals. On December 27, Revis was selected to his fifth Pro Bowl, his first with Tampa Bay. After the season, he was named SN Comeback Player Of The Year. During his first and only season with Tampa Bay, Revis started all 16 games with a sack, 2 interceptions, 11 passes defended, 2 forced fumbles, a fumble recovery, and 50 tackles. He was ranked 37th by his fellow players on the NFL Top 100 Players of 2014.

Despite Revis' outstanding season, he was not an ideal fit for Tampa Bay's defensive system. When Lovie Smith was hired to replace Greg Schiano, he brought his Tampa 2 defense with him, a zone defense that is focused on an elite middle linebacker, not a shutdown corner. Revis, being an elite man-to-man cornerback, was rumored to be on the trade bloc because of his large $16 million salary for the 2014 season.

On March 12, 2014, the Bucs released Revis after several failed attempts to trade him, making him an unrestricted free agent for the first time of his career.

=== New England Patriots ===
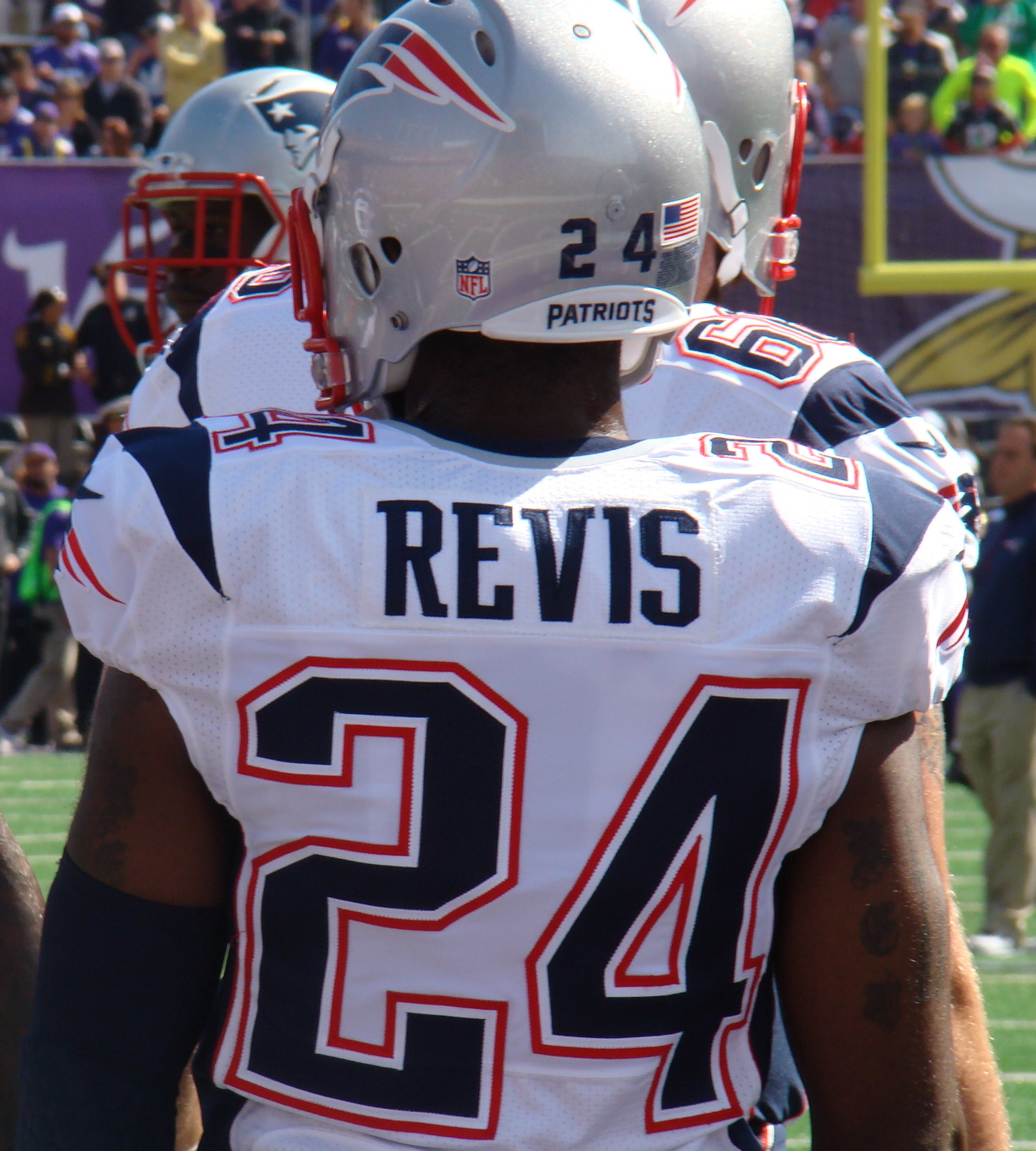
Revis with the Patriots in 2014.

On March 12, 2014, within hours of being released by the Buccaneers, Revis signed a 1-year contract worth $12 million with the New England Patriots, with the salary cap hit spread over two years. In Revis's first and only season in New England, he had 47 tackles, 2 interceptions, 14 passes defended, and 1 forced fumble. He was once again named to the Pro Bowl, his sixth overall selection, as well as his first first-team All-Pro selection since 2011, his fourth overall. The Patriots finished the season 12–4.

In the divisional round playoff game against the Baltimore Ravens, Revis had 2 pass interference calls against wide receiver Steve Smith Sr. The Patriots would go on to win the game 35–31 and advance to the AFC Championship game. In the AFC Championship game, Revis recorded an interception on Andrew Luck and the Patriots went on to defeat the Indianapolis Colts 45–7.

This marked Revis's first trip to the Super Bowl. The Patriots faced the Seattle Seahawks in Super Bowl XLIX on February 1, 2015, and won 28–24. Revis tallied a sack and a tackle in the game.

After the season, the Patriots did not pick up a $20-million option in Revis's contract to bring him back for a second year. He was ranked 17th by his fellow players on the NFL Top 100 Players of 2015.

=== New York Jets (second stint) ===
The Jets signed Revis to a five-year, $70 million contract with $39 million guaranteed on March 10, 2015. The Jets were, however, the subject of investigation into tampering after charges were filed by the Patriots. Jets owner Woody Johnson made comments about Revis, who was still under contract with New England at the time. Johnson was fined $100,000; however, the Jets' counter-investigation into Patriots owner Robert Kraft's comments about Revis upon re-signing with New York was dismissed by the league. Revis sustained a concussion against the Houston Texans on November 22, 2015. He was named to his seventh Pro Bowl and was ranked 24th on the NFL Top 100 Players of 2016. In 14 games of 2015, Revis finished with 39 tackles, five interceptions, and nine passes defended.

The 2016 season was one of Revis' worst outings, with opposing quarterback ratings recorded at 91.7 compared to 59.3 his previous years. He finished 2016 playing 15 games with 53 tackles, five passes defended, and one interception.

On February 28, 2017, the Jets announced that Revis would be released at the start of free agency on March 9, 2017.

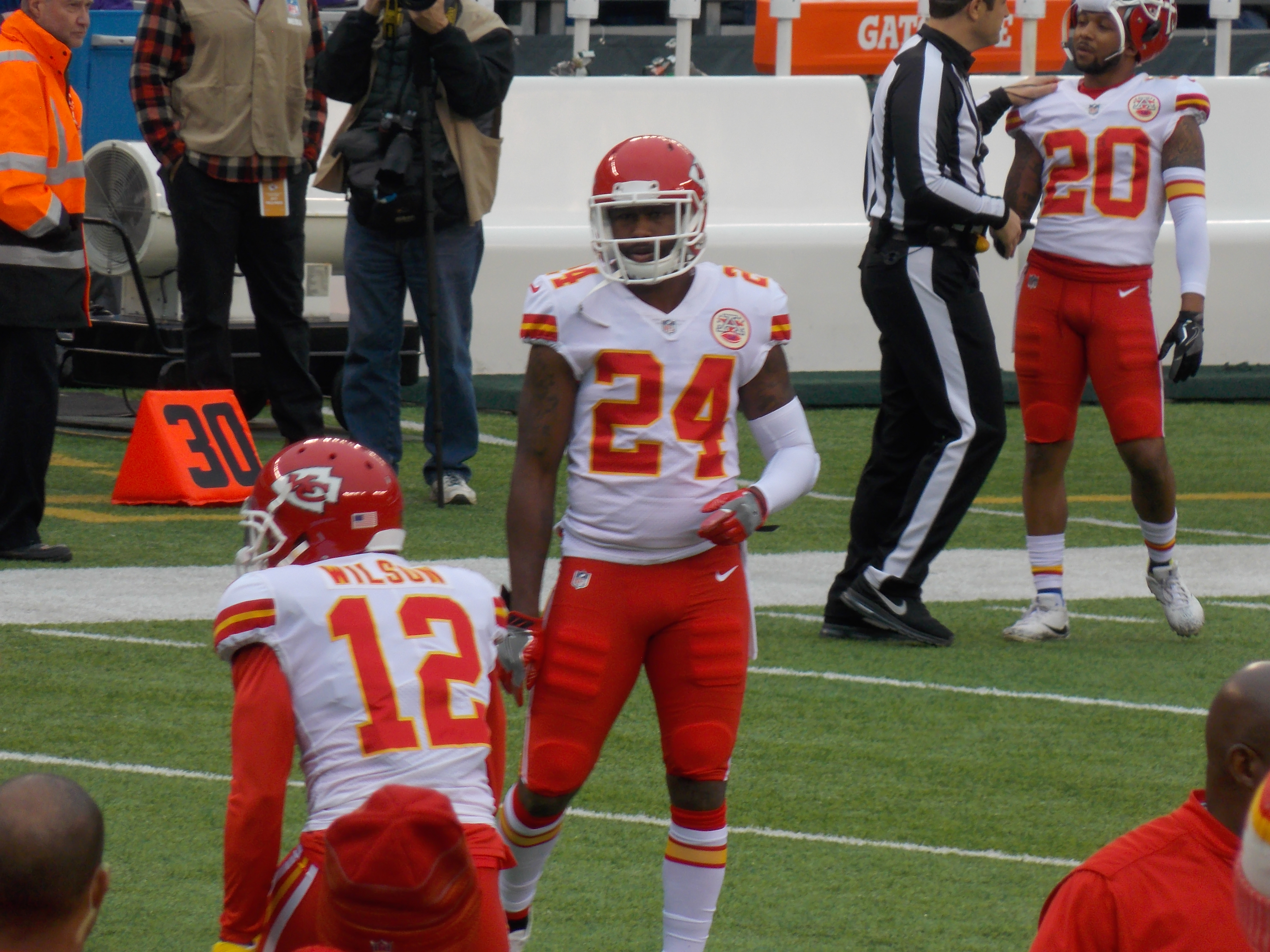
Revis in his first game with the Chiefs on December 3, 2017

=== Kansas City Chiefs ===
On November 22, 2017, Revis signed a two-year, $11 million contract with the Kansas City Chiefs. On February 8, 2018, Revis was released by the Chiefs after only playing six games for the team, including the playoffs.

=== Retirement ===
On July 18, 2018, Revis announced his retirement from the NFL after 11 seasons. On July 24, the New York Jets held a mini celebration honoring Revis for his retirement. The Jets made a miniature makeshift "Revis" island for his retirement.

== NFL career statistics ==
Legend
	Won the Super Bowl
	NFL record
	Led the league
**Bold**	Career high

=== Regular season ===
Year	Team	Games		Tackles				Interceptions						Fumbles			
Year	Team	GP	GS	Cmb	Solo	Ast	Sck	PD	Int	Yds	Avg	Lng	TD	FF	FR	Yds	TD
2007	NYJ	16	16	**87**	**74**	**13**	0.0	17	3	20	6.7	19	0	1	1	0	0
2008	NYJ	16	16	58	45	**13**	**1.0**	16	5	38	7.6	32	**1**	1	2	0	0
2009	NYJ	16	16	54	47	7	0.0	**31**	**6**	121	20.2	67	**1**	0	0	0	0
2010	NYJ	13	13	32	26	6	0.0	10	0	0	0.0	0	0	0	2	10	0
2011	NYJ	16	16	52	41	11	0.0	21	4	**184**	**46.0**	**100**	**1**	0	0	0	0
2012	NYJ	2	2	11	8	3	0.0	3	1	1	1.0	0	0	1	0	0	0
2013	TB	16	16	50	43	7	**1.0**	11	2	3	2.0	3	0	**2**	1	0	0
2014	NE	16	16	47	41	6	0.0	14	2	0	0.0	0	0	1	0	0	0
2015	NYJ	14	14	39	30	9	0.0	9	5	48	9.6	24	0	0	**4**	**18**	0
2016	NYJ	15	15	53	43	10	0.0	5	1	51	51.0	51	0	0	0	0	0
2017	KC	5	2	11	10	1	0.0	2	0	0	0.0	0	0	0	0	0	0
Career		145	142	497	411	86	2.0	139	29	466	16.1	100	3	6	10	28	0

=== Postseason ===
Year	Team	Games		Tackles				Interceptions						Fumbles			
Year	Team	GP	GS	Cmb	Solo	Ast	Sck	PD	Int	Yds	Avg	Lng	TD	FF	FR	Yds	TD
2009	NYJ	3	3	8	6	2	0.0	**4**	**2**	26	13.0	20	0	0	0	0	0
2010	NYJ	3	3	**15**	**10**	**5**	0.0	2	0	0	0.0	0	0	0	0	0	0
2014	NE	3	3	3	3	0	**1.0**	2	1	**30**	**30.0**	**30**	0	0	0	0	0
2017	KC	1	0	3	2	1	0.0	0	0	0	0.0	0	0	0	0	0	0
Career		10	9	29	21	8	1.0	8	3	56	18.7	30	0	0	0	0	0

== Career highlights ==
=== Awards and honors ===
NFL

- Super Bowl champion (XLIX)
- 4× First-team All-Pro (2009–2011, 2014)
- 7× Pro Bowl (2008–2011, 2013–2015)
- NFL 2010s All-Decade Team
- PFWA All-Rookie Team (2007)
- 6× NFL Top 100 — 8th (2011), 5th (2012), 67th (2013), 37th (2014), 17th (2015), 24th (2016)
- New York Jets Ring of Honor

College

- Sporting News First-team Freshman All-American (2004)
- Rivals.com Second-team Freshman All-American (2004)
- 2× First-team All-Big East (2005, 2006)
- Rivals.com Third-team All-American (2006)
- Jim Thorpe Award semifinalist (2006)
- ESPN College Football Play of the Year (2006)

=== New York Jets franchise records ===
- Longest interception return for a touchdown (100 yards, vs Miami Dolphins October 17, 2011, tied)
- Most career passes defended (112)

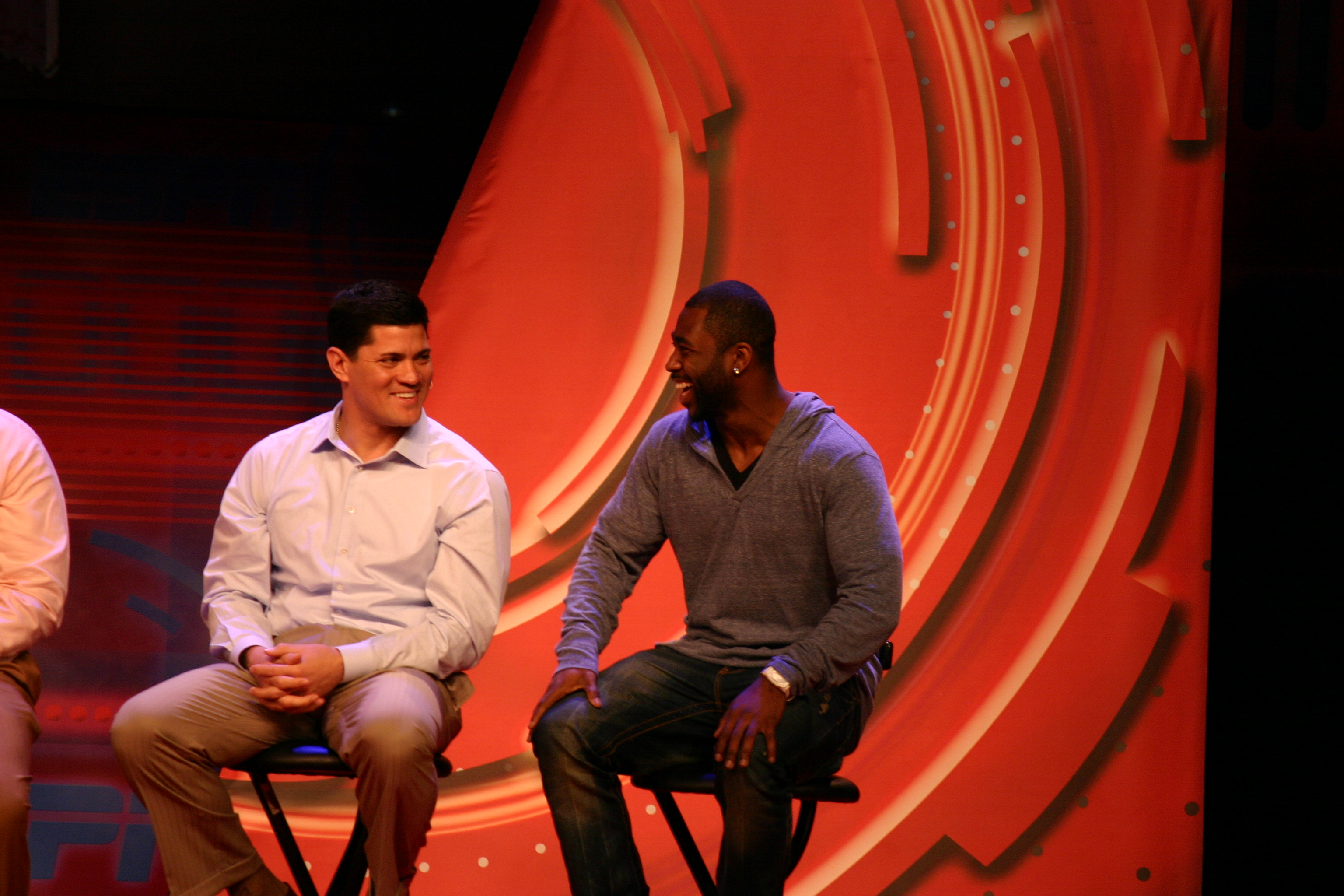
Revis with former NFL linebacker Tedy Bruschi

== Personal life ==
Revis is the nephew of former NFL defensive tackle Sean Gilbert. Revis has a daughter and a son. In December 2012, Darrelle released his own shoe, the Nike Zoom Revis, which is available in various colors. Revis was a friend of Pittsburgh rapper Mac Miller. Revis is the cousin of former NFL safety Jordan Whitehead, former NFL cornerback Mark Gilbert, and Notre Dame wide receiver Micah Gilbert.

On February 16, 2017, Revis was involved in a street brawl in Pittsburgh around 2:40 a.m. Revis was suspected to have attacked two men, knocking them unconscious. One follower attempted to record Revis on a cell phone, prompting Revis to snatch the phone and throw it out at the street. That night, Revis was charged for aggravated assault, robbery, terroristic threats and conspiracy stemming from the incident. Revis turned himself into police the following day and was released on non-monetary bond. All charges were dismissed March 15 after a friend of Revis testified that he was responsible for knocking the two men out.
