= Central Valley School District =

Central Valley School District may refer to:

- Central Valley School District (Pennsylvania)
- Central Valley School District (Washington)
