= Tommie Campbell =

American football player (born 1987)

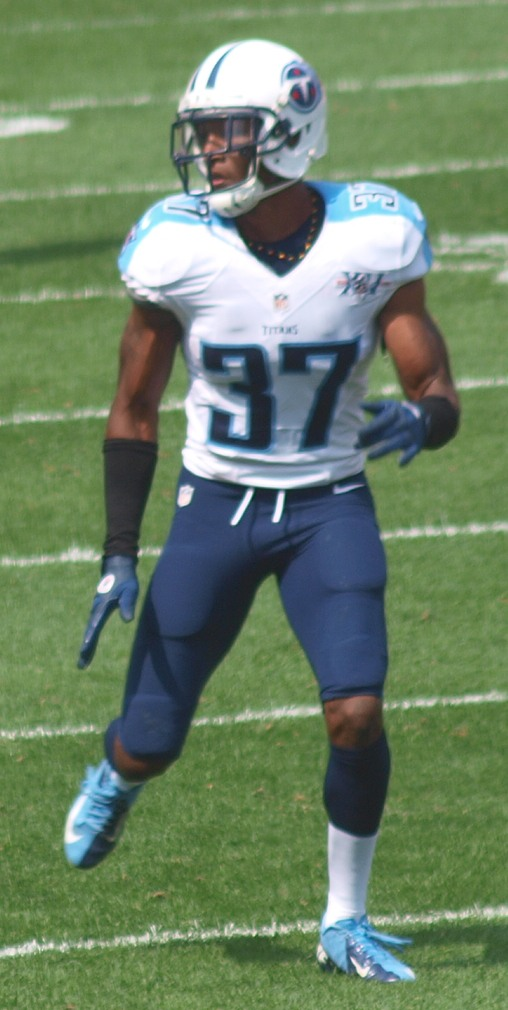
- Campbell with the Tennessee Titans in 2013

No. 37, 38, 23
- Position: Defensive back

Personal information
- Born: September 19, 1987 (age 39); Aliquippa, Pennsylvania, U.S.
- Listed height: 6 ft 3 in (1.91 m)
- Listed weight: 198 lb (90 kg)

Career information
- High school: Aliquippa
- College: California (PA)
- NFL draft: 2011: 7th round, 251st overall pick

Career history
- Tennessee Titans (2011–2013); Jacksonville Jaguars (2014); Calgary Stampeders (2016–2017); Montreal Alouettes (2018–2019); Toronto Argonauts (2020)*
- * Offseason or practice squad member only

Awards and highlights
- CFL All-Star (2016); CFL West All-Star (2016); CFL East All-Star (2019)

Career NFL statistics
- Total tackles: 37
- Forced fumbles: 2
- Pass deflections: 1
- Return yards: 149
- Total touchdowns: 2
- Stats at Pro Football Reference

Career CFL statistics
- Total tackles: 212
- Forced fumbles: 3
- Pass deflections: 16
- Stats at CFL.ca

Tommie James Campbell (born September 19, 1987) is an American former professional football player who was a cornerback in the National Football League (NFL) and Canadian Football League (CFL). He was selected by the Tennessee Titans in the seventh round of the 2011 NFL draft.

== Early life ==
While attending Aliquippa High School, Campbell was a multi-sport star in football, basketball and track. He was the Pennsylvania state high school sprint champion in 2005.

== College career ==
He went on to play college football for the Pittsburgh Panthers (2005–2006), Edinboro Fighting Scots (2007), and California Vulcans (2010). Academic problems ended his playing career at Pitt and Edinboro, and he was working as a janitor at Pittsburgh International Airport from 2008 to 2009. Campbell was afforded a third chance to play college football by the California University of Pennsylvania. Campbell made good on the third opportunity. He appeared in all 12 games for California (Pa.). California coach John Luckhardt said that Campbell's life experiences had helped him mature and quipped, "One of the things he said was that cleaning toilets at 12 o'clock at night really got his attention." Campbell, in turn, has expressed his gratitude to Coach Luckhardt for giving him another chance: "Cal gave me another shot at pursuing my dream, which is to be a success in the NFL." Based on his comeback performance in 2010, Campbell was one of only eight Division II players to participate in the 2011 Eastham Energy All-Star Game in Arizona. He also participated in the Cactus Bowl (Division II All Star Game) in Texas. Campbell ran a 4.31 40-yard dash at the Cactus Bowl, ranking third among the 300-plus prospects at the event.

== Professional career ==
Pre-draft measurables
Height	Weight	20-yard shuttle	Three-cone drill	Vertical jump	Broad jump
6 ft 2 7/8 in (1.90 m)	203 lb (92 kg)	4.21 s	7.01 s	34.0 in (0.86 m)	10 ft 3 in (3.12 m)
All values from Pro Day

=== Tennessee Titans ===
Campbell was selected by the Tennessee Titans in the seventh round of the 2011 NFL draft with the 251st overall pick. On August 29, 2014, he was released.

=== Jacksonville Jaguars ===
Campbell signed with the Jacksonville Jaguars after a season-ending injury to cornerback Alan Ball. He was waived on August 29, 2015.

=== Calgary Stampeders ===
Campbell started all 18 games and had 71 defensive tackles including a tackle for a loss, 1 special-teams tackle, 3 interceptions and 9 knockdowns, one of his interceptions being a game winning one in an overtime victory against the BC Lions in week 3. He also added four punt returns for 21 yards. He was named a West Division all-star. On January 24, 2017, Campbell turned himself into police custody after being charged with multiple drug related charges. Police believed he was selling drugs (170 grams of cocaine found in a backpack) out of his residence in Aliquippa, Pennsylvania during the CFL off-season. However, the charges were subsequently dropped as part of Pennsylvania’s “accelerated rehabilitative disposition program”, and his record cleared. Campbell returned to the Stamps for the team's 2017 training camp.

=== Montreal Alouettes ===
Campbell signed with the Montreal Alouettes on February 13, 2018. He was considered one of the top free agents on the market, having not allowed a touchdown during the 2017 regular season, On September 20, 2018, Campbell and the Alouettes agreed to a two-year contract extension; keeping him with the club through the 2020 season. Campbell finished the 2018 season with 38 tackles, 1 interception, and one forced fumble in 17 games played; Campbell was removed from the lineup for one game by head coach Mike Sherman for not buckling a chin strap at practice earlier in the week. Although the Alouettes finished the season out of playoff contention with a 5–13 record, Campbell and the ball-hawk Montreal defense helped improve the team's record by two wins from the previous season. Campbell got off to a fast start in 2019, forcing 3 turnovers in Montreal's first 4 games. In 16 games, Campbell made 66 tackles, 3 interceptions, and two forced fumbles, and was named a divisional All-Star. He was released by the Alouettes on January 31, 2020.

=== Toronto Argonauts ===
On February 5, 2020, Campbell signed with the Toronto Argonauts. He announced his retirement from football on December 30, 2020.
