= Aliquippa School District =

School district in Pennsylvania

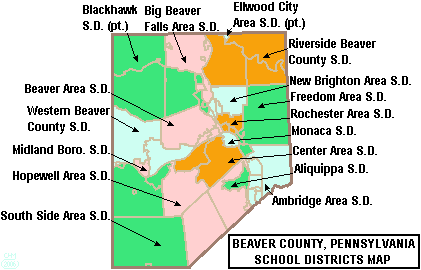

Address
- 800 21st Street Aliquippa, Pennsylvania, 15001; United States
- Coordinates: 40.610651°N 80.259565°W

District information
- Type: Public
- Motto: Excellence in Education
- Established: 1908
- Schools: 2 total: Aliquippa Elementary; Aliquippa Jr./Sr. High School
- NCES District ID: 4202130

Students and staff
- District mascot: Quips
- Colors: Red, black

Other information
- Website: quipsd.org

The Aliquippa School District is a small, urban, public school district located in Beaver County, Pennsylvania. The District serves the City of Aliquippa. Aliquippa School District encompasses approximately 4 square miles (10 km^{2}). According to 2010 federal census data, it serves a resident population of 9,438 people. In 2009, the district residents’ per capita income was $13,718, while the median family income was $34,003. In the Commonwealth, the median family income was $49,501 and the United States median family income was $49,445, in 2010. The educational attainment levels for the Aliquippa School District population (25 years old and over) were 86.5% high school graduates and 16.3% college graduates.

== History ==
The present Aliquippa School District, originally the Woodlawn School District, was organized on June 7, 1909. The borough of Woodlawn was incorporated from Hopewell Township in 1908. Its population drawn to the area by the establishment of the Aliquippa Works of Jones and Laughlin Steel Corporation along the Ohio River.

According to historian Ivagean Ferry, from whose "Brief History of Education in Aliquippa" much of the information in this account has been taken, two districts had been in operation in the area – the Logstown Independent District and the Aliquippa School District. In 1928 Aliquippa was renamed West Aliquippa when it consolidated with the town of Woodlawn, the larger borough, which at that time took the Indian name of Aliquippa."

The Woodlawn District in 1909 elected its first Board of School Directors: H. J. Johns, president; John T. Bell, secretary; W. G. Cochran (a non-member), treasurer; and members, C. H. Dinsmore, G. Walter Prosser, G. W. Gray, and J. H. Robb.

The challenge to the district, headed by Calvin Springer, was finding classrooms for its 225 pupils. They were housed in the Woodlawn Academy, the old Logstown School, and a room in the Dinsmore house on Hopewell Avenue. The ten-room Highland School was the first neighborhood school erected. In 1911 the eight-room Logstown School was constructed. Woodlawn High School, a two-story building of twelve rooms, opened in 1913. Laughlin School was built in 1917; Jones School was erected in 1919 by that time the student population was 2,000.

The first high school students of Woodlawn had been housed in elementary schools or sent to Beaver for senior classes and graduation. In 1913 the first senior class was graduated from the Logstown Building and the first class to be graduated from Woodlawn High School was the class of 1914.

In 1921, Woodlawn withdrew from Beaver County supervision and became an independent district, headed by Superintendent O.H. Locke.

Less than ten years after the construction of Woodlawn High School, a new high school was erected on a hilltop overlooking Franklin Avenue. With its 34 classrooms, laboratories and offices, the high school was completed in 1925. A second building phase followed: the construction of a gymnasium-auditorium and the first part of a vocational shop on the hill above the school. Originally named Harding High School after recently deceased President Warren G. Harding (who continues to be the namesake of Harding Avenue, the road that winds it way through the Aliquippa High School campus), in 1930 it was renamed the Aliquippa High School which would serve the community for more than 80 years until its closure in 2009 and subsequent demolition a year later.

In 1925 Aliquippa Borough annexed neighboring New Sheffield from Hopewell Township. Spaulding School, which had been newly built by the Hopewell Township School District (whose students attended Aliquippa High School until 1939, with the Class of 1940 remaining at Aliquippa to complete their studies), was transferred to the possession of the Aliquippa School District. The ten-room New Sheffield School was constructed in 1931 and still serves the community today. At the other end of the town, the McDonald School was built in 1940.

The school population had grown to 6,600 students by 1929. Because the district could not provide new schools immediately, in 1928, all-year-round school was the district's answer to the problem. As Mrs. Ferry explains, the all-year-round plan "set up four quarters of twelve weeks each ... The distribution of enrollment was made so that three-fourths of the children were in school and one-fourth on vacation each quarter."

In 1958 a new junior high school was built with a capacity of 1,200 which allowed the district to relocate all junior high students out of the elementary schools while also moving students out of the aging Franklin Junior High School (originally Woodlawn High School).

With the sixties came serious challenges. Late in the decade, racial unrest led to upheavals in the junior and senior high schools and to the temporary closing of the schools in 1970. A comprehensive survey of the community and its schools was made and the district set up a study team of members of the National Education Association and the state and Pittsburgh chapters of the N.A.A.C.P., which met with the city's biracial Human Relations Committee to try to find solutions. Lawrence M. Maravich, elected superintendent in 1966, reported on policies being put into practice to promote equality of opportunity. It was found imperative to put the child first, not the curriculum. To desegregate the schools, Aliquippa changed its organizational structure and grouped classes into three units: for elementary school, K–4, for middle school, 5–8, for high school, 9–12. The Highland, Logstown, Jones, Laughlin, Spaulding and Franklin elementary schools were all closed and its students were sent to New Sheffield School which became the district's only elementary school.

Rather unexpectedly, in the eighties came the collapse of the industry that had created and nourished the community. LTV Steel, the successor to the Jones and Laughlin Steel Company which built Aliquippa, closed most of the Aliquippa Works in 1984 which saw over 5,000 workers lose their jobs. The school district suffered devastating effects including the loss of most of its tax base, declining enrollment, increased poverty and significant cuts to programs and curriculum due to budget cuts. From a peak of 6,600 in the early 1930s enrollment declined to 1,779 in 1987. In an effort to cut costs and consolidate students the less than 30-year-old junior high school was closed, grades 5 and 6 were relocated to the elementary school and grades 7 and 8 were sent to the high school. This lasted less than a decade when due to overcrowding the junior high was reopened in the mid 1990s and was renamed Aliquippa Middle School.

The district continued to face problems into the 2000s as enrollment and tax revenue declined further and the district's facilities continued to age. The high school, in particular, had been slowly deteriorating for years and had gotten to a point where portions of the building had to be closed off to protect students. Beginning in the 2007-08 school year a massive remodeling and renovation project was begun at the elementary and middle schools and grades were once again realigned with kindergarten through 6th grade being moved to Aliquippa Elementary School (the formerly-named New Sheffield School) and 7th through 12th grades being moved to the middle school which would become the new Aliquippa Junior/Senior High School. The old high school, which served the community for 85 years and had become a symbol for Aliquippians for decades, was closed with the Class of 2009 being the last to graduate from the building.
