= Queen Alliquippa =

Leader of the Seneca tribe of American Indians

Queen Aliquippa
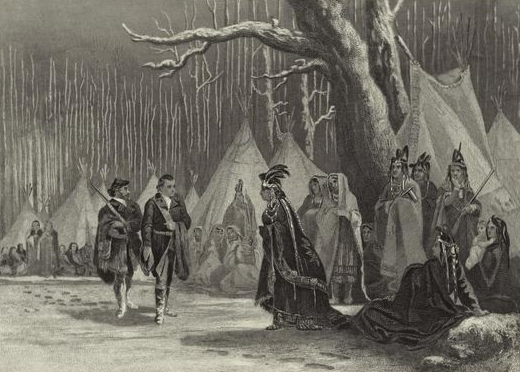
- Washington and Gist visit Queen Aliquippa, 1753

Mingo Seneca tribe leader

Personal details
- Born: (1670?-1700s?)
- Died: December 23, 1754 Huntingdon County, Pennsylvania
- Children: Son, Kanuksusy Daughter, Summer Eve

Queen Alliquippa or Queen Aliquippa (died December 23, 1754) was a leader of the Seneca tribe of American Indians during the early part of the 18th century.

== Biography ==
Little is known about Queen Aliquippa's early life. Her date of birth has been estimated anywhere from the early 1670s to the early 18th century. By the 1740s, she was the leader of a band of Mingo Seneca living along the three rivers (the Ohio River, the Allegheny River, and the Monongahela River) near what is now Pittsburgh, Pennsylvania. By 1753, she and her band were living at the confluence of the Monongahela and Youghiogheny Rivers near the present-day city of McKeesport, Pennsylvania.

George Washington wrote of his visit to Queen Aliquippa in December 1753 stating:

As we intended to take horse here [ at Frazer's Cabin on the mouth of Turtle Creek ], and it required some time to find them, I went up about three miles to the mouth of the Youghiogheny to visit Queen Aliquippa, who had expressed great concern that we passed her in going to [ Fort Le Boeuf ]. I made her a present of a match-coat and a bottle of rum, which latter was thought much the better present of the two.

Queen Aliquippa was a key ally of the British leading up to the French and Indian War. She, her son Kanuksusy, and warriors from her band of Mingo Seneca traveled to Fort Necessity to assist George Washington, but did not take an active part in the Battle of the Great Meadows on July 3–4, 1754.

After the British defeat at the Battle of the Great Meadows and the evacuation of Fort Necessity, Queen Aliquippa moved her band to the Aughwick Valley of Huntingdon County, Pennsylvania for safety. She died there on December 23, 1754.

== Legacy ==
The city of Aliquippa, Pennsylvania was named in her honor by the Pittsburgh and Lake Erie Railroad. However, she herself had no connection to the land upon which the city was built.

She is mentioned by Tom Hanks's character in one of the last scenes of Charlie Wilson's War, when discussing matters with Gust Avrakotos in a reference to his hometown of Aliquippa, Pennsylvania.

== Chronological notes ==
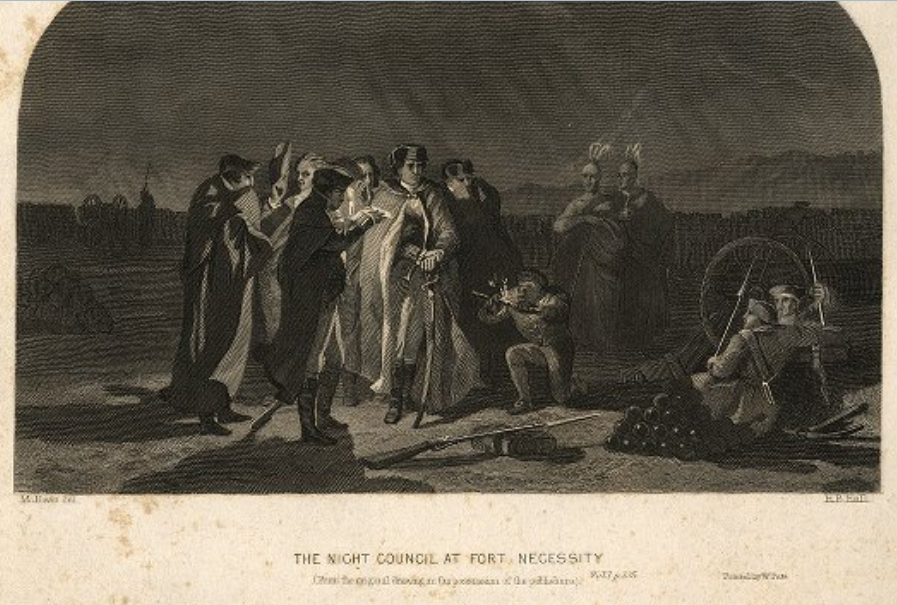
An engraving depicting the evening council of George Washington at Fort Necessity.

In 1752, Conrad Weiser reported visiting Queen Aliquippa, at "Aliquippa's Town" located on the Ohio at the mouth of Chartiers Creek, a tributary of the Ohio River near McKees Rocks and Pittsburgh. In January, 1754, George Washington, was sent by Virginia's Lt. Governor Dinwiddie to ask the French to leave the Ohio region, and he met with Haudenosaunee leaders at Logstown; whilst there, Washington failed to pay his respects to Queen Aliquippa. Washington arrived at the Great Meadows (Fort Necessity) 24 May 1754. A Virginia regiment arrived at the Great Meadows with Tanacharison (known as the "Half King") on 9 June 1754. Battle of Fort Necessity occurred 3 July 1754. On the 4th of July, Washington surrendered to the French and accepted defeat. The British troops left Fort Necessity for Wills Creek on the morning of July 4, from there they marched back to Virginia. To understand the events of the day, a hearing conducted by Virginia's Lt. Governor Dinwiddie was held.

On August 27, 1754, a deposition was filed by a Captain John B. W. Shaw that stated the Native Americans, including Queen Aliquippa, loyal to the British were going to "Jemmy Arther" for protection. "Jemmy Arther" was Aughwick or George Croghan's settlement, just north of the modern-day Shirleysburg. In a letter dated 16 August 1754, Croghan wrote to the governor of the province of Pennsylvania that Tanacharison and his fellow Mingo Seneca people had been staying with him at Aughwick since Washington's defeat (Hazard 1897, 140-141). Conrad Weiser visited Croghan's homestead at Aughwick on September 3, 1754 to investigate the situation and reported to Governor Hamilton. In Wiser's report to the Governor he reported to the Governor that; " ... he had encountered about twenty cabins about Croghan's house, and in them at least 200 Indians, men, women and children ..." (Hazard 1878, 149).

On December 23, 1754, Queen Aliquippa died at Aughwick (Fort Shirley). Croghan's blunt journal entry records her death, "Alequeapy, ye old quine is dead.". Alliquippa, a Delaware village, was on the farm of William Hartley, Esq., on the east bank of the Raystown branch, near Mt. Dallas and the historic village of Bloody Run (Everett, Pennsylvania). Tradition says the village, a gap and a hill were all named after Queen Alliquippa, who lived there in her youth, and these names are so given on a map of the Province of 1770. A letter written from Alliquippa village on June 17, 1775, at the time some of the Provincial troops were there says: "The Queen Alliquippa, upon the surrender of the unfinished fort at the Forks of the Ohio by Ensign Ward had returned to this place." From the expression "had returned" it is fair to infer that she formerly lived there and was subsequently buried there.
