= Francis J. D'Eramo =

American judge

Francis J. D'Eramo, (1959 - April 27, 2009) BA, JD, from December 2006 until April 2009, served as a Judge at the United States Virgin Islands Superior Court on the island of St. Croix. Before joining the Superior Court, he spent over 20 years in private practice in Christiansted, St. Croix.

== Career ==
D'Eramo was born in Aliquippa, Pennsylvania in 1959, and moved to the United States Virgin Islands in 1985 to work as an attorney with Isherwood, Hunter and Colianni. In 1987, he took a position with the Nichols, Newman, Silverlight law firm, and became a partner in 1997.

D'Eramo was a civil lawyer, practicing in the areas of employment law, banking, and commercial law. He served as general counsel to non-profit organizations such as The Village-Virgin Islands Partners in Recover, V.I. Perinatal, Inc., The St. Croix Montessori School, and St. Croix Country Day School.

D'Eramo was president of the V.I. Legal Assistance Foundation (which administers IOLTA funds) from 1996 to 2006, and again from 2007 to the present. He is a member of the Virgin Islands and Pennsylvania Bar associations and was admitted to practice before the United States Court of Appeals for the Third Circuit in 1987. In 2006 he received the Winston A. Hodge Award for service to the community from the Virgin Islands Bar Association. He has published articles for the Black Law Journal, Civil Rights Litigators' Annual, Virgin Islands Bar Journal and the Virgin Islands Daily News.

== Education ==
D'Eramo attended the University of Notre Dame for his undergraduate education in the Great Books program and later the University of Pittsburgh School of Law, where he was a member of the Law Review. He graduated from Hopewell High School, Aliquippa, Pennsylvania in June 1978.

== Death ==
D'Eramo was found dead in his Christiansted home on April 27, 2009. The USVI District Attorney's office released a preliminary statement on April 28, 2009, indicating that D'Eramo took his own life. He was last seen alive the evening of April 25, 2009.
