= Central Valley High School (Pennsylvania) =

Location
- 160 Baker Road Extension; Monaca, Pennsylvania 15061; United States; 40.6609°N 80.3038°W

Information
- Type: Public, Coeducational high school
- Established: 2009
- School district: Central Valley School District
- Principal: Mark Vukovcan
- Grades: 9–12
- Enrollment: 723 (2023–2024)
- Student to teacher ratio: 16.43
- Colors: Carolina Blue; Navy Blue
- Athletics: Football, Basketball, Soccer, Baseball, Softball, Tennis, Golf, Track and Field, Wrestling, and Swimming
- Athletics conference: Western Pennsylvania Interscholastic Athletic League
- Team name: Warriors
- Website: www.centralvalleysd.org/centralvalleyhighschool_home.aspx

Central Valley High School is a public high school in Center Township, Beaver County, Pennsylvania, United States. It is the only high school in the Central Valley School District. Athletic teams compete as the Central Valley Warriors in the Western Pennsylvania Interscholastic Athletic League.

The high school resulted from the 2010 merger of Center High School and Monaca High School.

== Notable alumni ==
- Robert Foster, footballer
- Jordan Whitehead, footballer
