= Michael D'Eramo =

Italian footballer

Personal information
- Date of birth: 13 August 1999 (age 27)
- Place of birth: Atessa, Italy
- Height: 1.74 m (5 ft 9 in)
- Position: Midfielder

Team information
- Current team: Lanciano FC

Youth career
- –2016: Angolana
- 2015–2016: → Vicenza (loan)

Senior career*
Years	Team	Apps	(Gls)
2016–2019	Avezzano	78	(14)
2019–2020	Spezia	0	(0)
2019–2020	→ Rimini (loan)	0	(0)
2019–2020	→ Ravenna (loan)	26	(2)
2020–2021	Vis Pesaro	25	(2)
2021–2024	Ancona	49	(3)
2024–2025	Sambenedettese	29	(0)
2025–	Lanciano FC		
- * Club domestic league appearances and goals as of 4 May 2025

Michael D'Eramo (born 13 August 1999) is an Italian professional footballer who plays as a midfielder for Lanciano FC.

== Club career ==
Born in Atessa, D'Eramo started his career in Angolana, and played one season in Vicenza youth sector.

In 2016, he joined Serie D club Avezzano, and made his senior debut.

In 2019, he signed for Serie B club Spezia. He was loaned to Ravenna, and made his professional debut on 25 August 2019 against Fermana.

THe next year, on 3 September 2020, he signed with Vis Pesaro.

On 6 July 2021, he joined to new club Ancona-Matelica.
