= Jordan Whitehead =

American football player (born 1997)

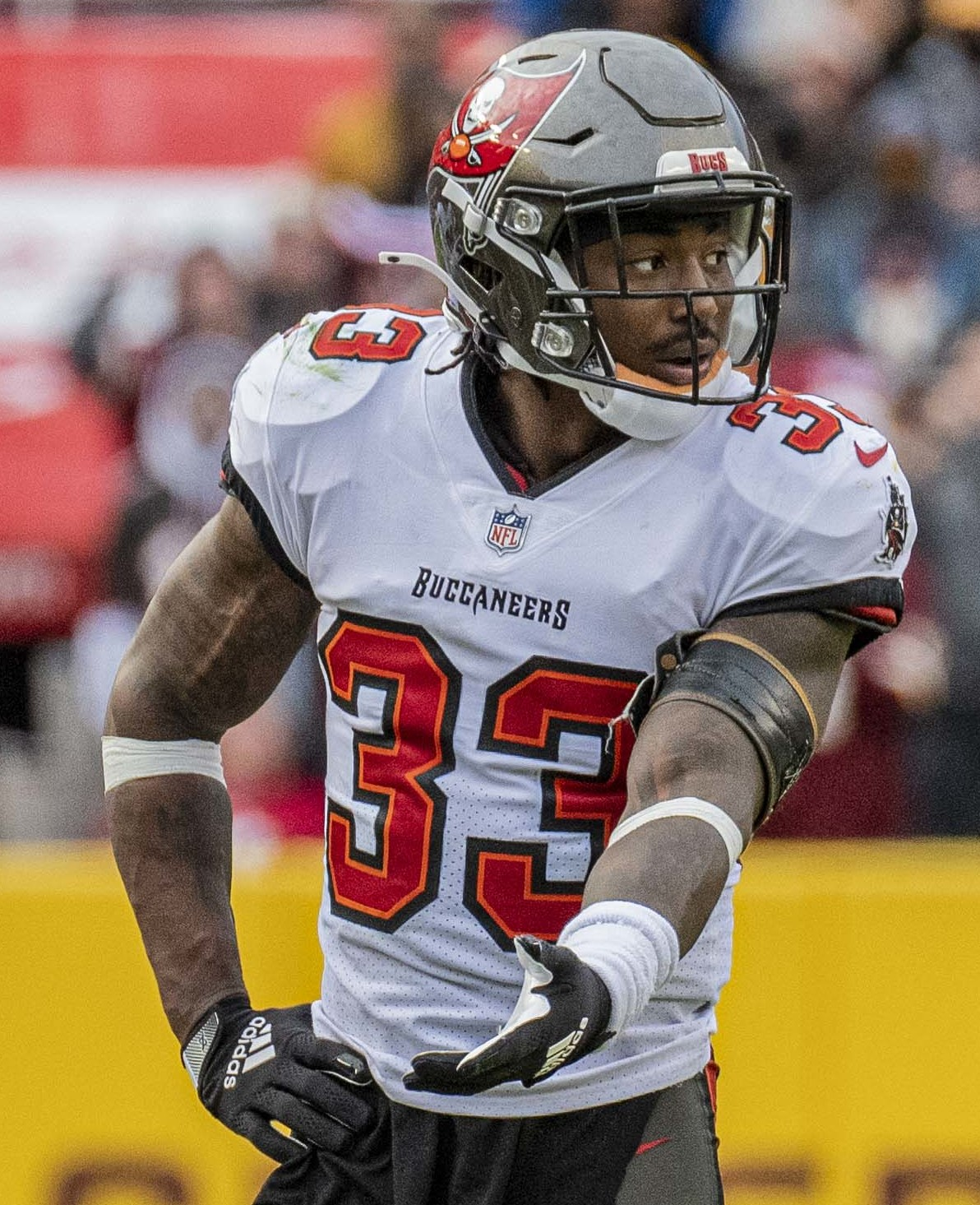
- Whitehead with the Tampa Bay Buccaneers in 2021

Profile
- Position: Safety

Personal information
- Born: March 18, 1997 (age 29); Pittsburgh, Pennsylvania, U.S.
- Listed height: 5 ft 10 in (1.78 m)
- Listed weight: 198 lb (90 kg)

Career information
- High school: Central Valley (Monaca, Pennsylvania)
- College: Pittsburgh (2015–2017)
- NFL draft: 2018: 4th round, 117th overall pick

Career history
- Tampa Bay Buccaneers (2018–2021); New York Jets (2022–2023); Tampa Bay Buccaneers (2024)

Awards and highlights
- Super Bowl champion (LV); Second-team All-ACC (2016); ACC Rookie of the Year (2015); ACC Defensive Rookie of the Year (2015)

Career NFL statistics as of 2024
- Total tackles: 557
- Sacks: 2.5
- Forced fumbles: 2
- Fumble recoveries: 2
- Interceptions: 11
- Pass deflections: 45
- Stats at Pro Football Reference

Jordan Tyler Whitehead (born March 18, 1997) is an American professional football safety. He played college football for the Pittsburgh Panthers. Whitehead was selected by the Tampa Bay Buccaneers in the fourth round of the 2018 NFL draft.

== Early life ==
Whitehead attended Central Valley High School in Monaca, Pennsylvania. In addition to playing football, he also ran track. He played on both sides of the ball for Central Valley and was a starter since his freshman year. As a senior, Whitehead caught 24 passes for 471 yards along with rushing for 1,933 yards on 148 attempts. He totaled 35 touchdowns along with tallying 97 tackles and seven interceptions. Whitehead committed to play football for the Pittsburgh Panthers on October 3, 2014, choosing the Panthers over Penn State and West Virginia.

== College career ==
As a true freshman in 2015, Whitehead played in all 13 of Pittsburgh's games, starting in the last 12. Offensively, he carried the ball 12 times for 122 yards resulting in two touchdowns. On defense, he tallied 108 tackles, one interception, six pass deflections and one fumble recovery. He was named the ACC's Rookie of the Year and Defensive Rookie of the Year by the Atlantic Coast Sports Media Association along with being named to USA Today's All-American Team, being named the ACC's Defensive Rookie of the Year, and being named to the ACC's All-Conference Third-team.

In 2016, Whitehead played in Pitt's first nine games before missing their last three due to injury. In nine games, Whitehead compiled 65 tackles, one interception returned 59 yards for a touchdown, two pass deflections and a forced fumble along with rushing for 98 yards on nine attempts. He was awarded a second-team all ACC spot, even though he did not play all 12 games.

As a junior in 2017, Whitehead missed Pitt's first three games, but played in the last nine. Defensively, he tallied 60 tackles, four pass deflections, and one interception. On offense, he ran the ball 22 times for 142 yards and caught two passes for seven yards. After the season, Whitehead declared for the 2018 NFL draft, forgoing his senior year.

== Professional career ==
External videos
- Jordan Whitehead's NFL Combine Workout
- NFL Draft Profile: Jordan Whitehead

Pre-draft measurables
Height	Weight	Arm length	Hand span	40-yard dash	10-yard split	20-yard split	20-yard shuttle	Three-cone drill	Vertical jump	Broad jump	Bench press
5 ft 10 3/8 in (1.79 m)	198 lb (90 kg)	29 3/4 in (0.76 m)	8 1/2 in (0.22 m)	4.59 s	1.61 s	2.66 s	4.31 s	7.16 s	34 in (0.86 m)	10 ft 3 in (3.12 m)	21 reps
All values from NFL Combine/Pittsburgh's Pro Day

=== Tampa Bay Buccaneers (first stint) ===
The Tampa Bay Buccaneers selected Whitehead in the fourth round (117th overall) of the 2018 NFL draft. The Tampa Bay Buccaneers acquired the pick they used to draft Whitehead in a trade that sent their second round (56th overall) pick to the New England Patriots in exchange for a second and fourth round pick. The New England Patriots drafted cornerback Duke Dawson 56th overall while the Buccaneers drafted Whitehead and cornerback Carlton Davis. Duke Dawson would never play a snap before being released after one season while Whitehead and Carlton Davis would both start in Super Bowl LV. He was the 10th safety drafted in 2018.

External videos
- Buccaneers draft Whitehead 117th overall

==== 2018 season ====
On May 10, 2018, the Tampa Bay Buccaneers signed Whitehead to a four-year, $3.12 million contract that includes a signing bonus of $667,257.

Throughout training camp, Whitehead competed for a role as a starting safety against Keith Tandy, Chris Conte, and Justin Evans. Head coach Dirk Koetter named Chris Conte and Justin Evans the starting safeties to begin the season, with Whitehead listed as a backup behind Keith Tandy and Isaiah Johnson.

On September 9, 2018, Whitehead made his professional regular season debut in the Buccaneers' season-opening 48–40 victory at the New Orleans Saints, appearing almost entirely on special teams. Whitehead was inactive for the Buccaneers' Week 4 loss at the Chicago Bears due to a shoulder and hamstring injury. On October 14, 2018, Whitehead earned his first career start after Chris Conte was placed on injured reserve due to a knee injury. Whitehead finished the Buccaneers' 34–29 loss at the Atlanta Falcons with six combined tackles (four solo). Prior to Week 8, Whitehead was named the starting strong safety for the remainder of the season. In Week 12, he collected a season-high ten solo tackles and broke up two pass attempts during a 27–9 win against the San Francisco 49ers. He finished his rookie season in 2018 with 76 combined tackles (61 solo) and four pass deflections in 15 games and 11 starts.

The Tampa Bay Buccaneers finished the 2018 NFL season with a 5–11 record. On December 30, 2018, the Tampa Bay Buccaneers fired head coach Dirk Koetter.

==== 2019 season ====
Throughout training camp, he competed to be the starting strong safety against rookie Mike Edwards. Head coach Bruce Arians named Whitehead the starting strong safety to begin the regular season, alongside free safety Mike Edwards.

On September 29, 2019, Whitehead recorded two solo tackles, a season-high three pass deflections, and had his first career interception on a pass thrown by Jared Goff intended for wide receiver Cooper Kupp during a 55–40 win at the Los Angeles Rams in Week 4. In Week 14, Whitehead racked up a season-high nine combined tackles (six solo) as the Buccaneers defeated the Indianapolis Colts 38–35. The following week, Whitehead made one solo tackle and a pass deflection before sustaining a hamstring injury and exiting during the second quarter of a 38–17 win against the Detroit Lions. On December 18, 2019, the Buccaneers officially placed him on injured reserve and he subsequently missed the remaining two games of the season (Weeks 16–17). He finished his sophomore season in 2019 with a total of 69 combined tackles (50 solo), nine pass deflections, one interception, and one fumble recovery in 14 games and 14 starts.

==== 2020 season ====
Defensive coordinator Todd Bowles elected to retain Whitehead as the starting strong safety and paired him with rookie Antoine Winfield Jr. to kick off the regular season. In Week 3 at the Denver Broncos, Whitehead recorded five combined tackles (four solo) and had his first career sack on quarterback Jeff Driskel during a 28–10 victory. On November 8, 2020, Whitehead collected a season-high eight combined tackles (five solo) as the Buccaneers were routed at home 38–3 by the New Orleans Saints. On November 23, 2020, Whitehead recorded seven combined tackles (four solo), deflected a pass, and intercepted a pass attempt by Jared Goff as the Buccaneers were defeated 27–24 by the Los Angeles Rams on Monday Night Football. He finished the 2020 NFL season with 76 combined tackles (53 solo), four pass deflections, two interceptions, two sacks, one forced fumble, and a single fumble recovery while starting all 16 games, marking his first full season of his career.

==== 2020 NFL Playoffs ====
The Tampa Bay Buccaneers finished second in the NFC South with an 11–5 record to clinch a Wildcard berth. On January 9, 2021, Whitehead started in his first playoff appearance and only had one pass deflection during a 31–23 win over the Washington Football Team in the NFC Wildcard Game. On January 24, 2021, Whitehead started in the NFC Championship Game and recorded five combined tackles (four solo) and two forced fumbles, with one being on running back Aaron Jones that was recovered by teammate Devin White during the Buccaneers' 31–26 victory at the Green Bay Packers. He injured his shoulder and hamstring during the game and was listed as questionable leading up to the Super Bowl. On February 7, 2021, Whitehead started in Super Bowl LV, but was limited to two solo tackles as the Tampa Bay Buccaneers routed the Kansas City Chiefs 31–9.

=== New York Jets ===
On March 17, 2022, the New York Jets signed Whitehead to a one–year, $5.25 million contract that is fully guaranteed upon signing and includes a signing bonus of $4.12 million. On October 2, Whitehead would record his first interception of the season off Steelers' QB Kenny Pickett's first career pass attempt.

In Week 1 of the 2023 season, Whitehead intercepted Buffalo Bills quarterback Josh Allen three times, eclipsing his career high in interceptions for an entire season up to that point. In doing so, he met a contract incentive only a week into the season, earning a $250,000 bonus. He was named AFC Defensive Player of the Week for his performance.

=== Tampa Bay Buccaneers (second stint) ===
On March 13, 2024, Whitehead signed a two-year contract to return to the Buccaneers. On January 4, 2025, Whitehead was involved in a car accident on his way to the Buccaneers practice facility. Whitehead suffered injuries severe enough to be placed Non-Football Injury (NFI) list, ruling him out for several weeks including the Buccaneers' season finale against the New Orleans Saints to clinch the NFC South division title. On February 26, the Buccaneers declined Whitehead's 2025 option making him a free agent.

== NFL career statistics ==
Legend
	Won the Super Bowl
**Bold**	Career high

=== Regular season ===
Year	Team	Games		Tackles					Interceptions						Fumbles				
Year	Team	GP	GS	Cmb	Solo	Ast	Sck	Sfty	PD	Int	Yds	Y/I	Lng	TD	FF	FR	Yds	Y/R	TD
2018	TB	15	11	76	61	15	0.0	0	4	0	0	—	0	0	0	0	0	—	0
2019	TB	14	14	69	50	19	0.0	0	**9**	1	11	11.0	11	0	0	**1**	0	0.0	0
2020	TB	16	16	74	53	21	**2.0**	0	4	2	2	1.0	2	0	**1**	**1**	0	0.0	0
2021	TB	14	14	73	58	15	0.0	0	8	2	**24**	**12.0**	**17**	0	**1**	0	0	—	0
2022	NYJ	**17**	**17**	89	58	31	0.0	0	8	2	5	2.5	5	0	0	0	0	—	0
2023	NYJ	**17**	**17**	**97**	**65**	**32**	0.5	0	**9**	**4**	6	1.5	6	0	0	0	0	—	0
2024	TB	12	12	79	49	30	0.0	0	3	0	0	—	0	0	0	0	0	—	0
Career		105	101	557	394	163	2.5	0	45	11	48	4.4	17	0	2	2	0	—	0

=== Postseason ===
Year	Team	Games		Tackles							Interceptions						Fumbles				
Year	Team	GP	GS	Cmb	Solo	Ast	TFL	QBH	Sck	Sfty	PD	Int	Yds	Y/I	Lng	TD	FF	FR	Yds	Y/R	TD
2020	TB	**4**	**4**	9	8	1	0	0	0.0	0	**1**	0	0	—	0	0	**2**	0	0	—	0
2021	TB	2	2	**13**	**10**	**3**	**2**	0	0.0	0	0	0	0	—	0	0	0	0	0	—	0
Career		6	6	22	18	4	2	0	0.0	0	1	0	0	—	0	0	2	0	0	—	0

== Personal life ==
Whitehead is a cousin of fellow former New York Jet and Pro Football Hall of Fame cornerback Darrelle Revis.
