= Aliquippa, Pennsylvania =

City in Pennsylvania, US

- City
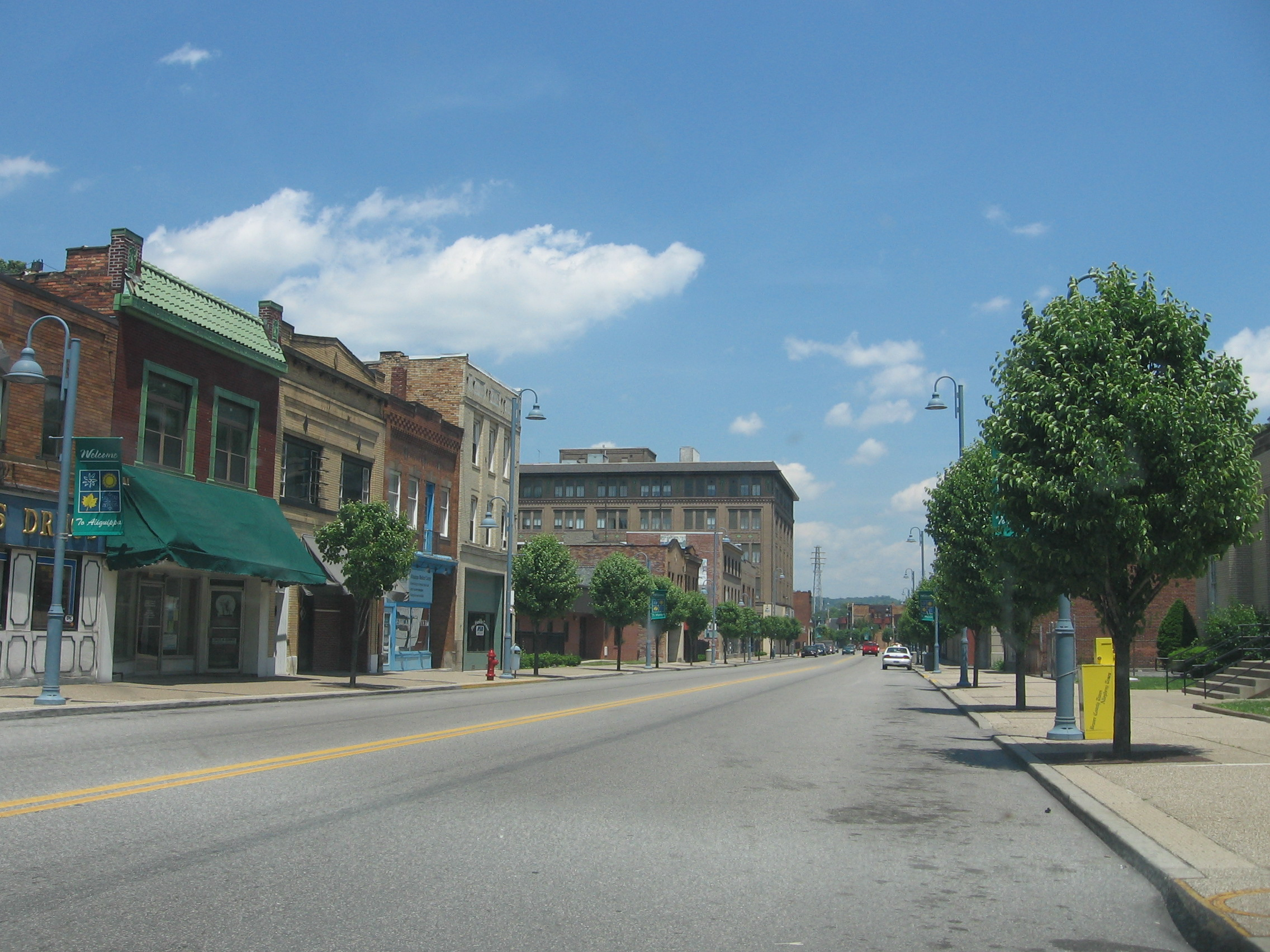
- Downtown Aliquippa (2008)

- Flag
- Interactive map of Aliquippa, Pennsylvania
- Location within Pennsylvania Location within the United States
- Coordinates: 40°36′54″N 80°15′36″W
- Country: United States
- State: Pennsylvania
- County: Beaver
- Settled: 1793
- Incorporated: 1894
- 1928 (borough)
- 1987 (city)

Government
  - Type: City Council

Area
  - Total: 4.59 sq mi (11.90 km^{2})
  - Land: 4.19 sq mi (10.86 km^{2})
  - Water: 0.40 sq mi (1.04 km^{2})
- Elevation: 850 ft (260 m)

Population (2020)
  - Total: 9,238
  - Density: 2,202.9/sq mi (850.54/km^{2})
- Time zone: UTC−5 (Eastern (EST))
  - Summer (DST): UTC−4 (EDT)
- ZIP Code: 15001
- FIPS code: 42-00820
- Website: www.aliquippapa.gov

Aliquippa is a city in Beaver County, Pennsylvania, United States. The population was 9,238 at the 2020 census. It is located along the Ohio River, 18 miles (29 km) northwest of Pittsburgh and is part of the Pittsburgh metropolitan area.

Formerly the location of a large Native American trading center, Aliquippa grew to become a center for steel manufacturing by the early 20th century, similar to other towns in the area. With the closure of most large employers by the 1980s, Aliquippa has since become an economically distressed community.

== History ==
An aerial view of Aliquippa in 1938 with Jones and Laughlin Steel Company's plant visible in the background

The oldest church within the current boundaries of Aliquippa is Mt. Carmel Presbyterian Church (formerly White Oak Flats Presbyterian Church), established about 1793 in the New Sheffield region on Brodhead Road.

Aliquippa was founded in 1894. It was the merger of three towns: Aliquippa, Woodlawn, and New Sheffield. There is no known direct connection between Seneca nation Queen Aliquippa and the city; rather, "Aliquippa" was one of several Indian names selected arbitrarily by the Pittsburgh and Lake Erie Railroad in 1878 for stations along its route.

Aliquippa is best known as the location of a productive steel mill that the Jones and Laughlin Steel Company constructed there along the Ohio River beginning in 1905. Employment at the facility sustained a population of 27,023 in 1940. The mill closed in 1984 during the collapse of the steel industry during the 1980s, and was demolished in 1988. This major economic loss, alongside suburbanization, caused major population loss through the end of the 20th century. Many of the city's businesses have left since the closing of the mill. This has left the city economically depressed, with the crime rate dramatically rising over time.

The B.F. Jones Memorial Library is a historical landmark of the community. Named for steel tycoon Benjamin Franklin Jones, it was built in 1927 with money donated by Jones' daughter. In 1978, the library was added to the National Register of Historic Places for its architecture and for its association with Jones in the development of Aliquippa. Aliquippa station, built in 1911, is also listed on the National Register.

Aliquippa was formally chartered as a city in 1987 by the Aliquippa Borough Council. USAir Flight 427 crashed near Aliquippa on September 8, 1994.

== Geography ==
According to the United States Census Bureau, the city has a total area of 4.6 square miles (11.9 km²), of which 4.19 square miles (10.86 km²) is land and 0.4 square mile (1.0 km²) is water. Aliquippa is surrounded by Hopewell Township. Across the Ohio River, the city runs adjacent with, from north to south, the borough of Baden, Harmony Township and the borough of Ambridge which connects to Aliquippa via the Ambridge–Aliquippa Bridge.

== Demographics ==
Historical population
Census	Pop.	Note	%±
1900	620		—
1910	1,743		181.1%
1920	2,931		68.2%
1930	27,116		825.1%
1940	27,023		−0.3%
1950	26,132		−3.3%
1960	26,369		0.9%
1970	22,277		−15.5%
1980	17,094		−23.3%
1990	13,374		−21.8%
2000	11,734		−12.3%
2010	9,438		−19.6%
2020	9,238		−2.1%

The city's population peaked in the 1930s. Since then, it has declined by two-thirds to just over 9,000 people, from a high of 27,116 in the 1930 census.

=== Racial and ethnic composition ===
Aliquippa city, Pennsylvania – Racial and ethnic composition Note: the US Census treats Hispanic/Latino as an ethnic category. This table excludes Latinos from the racial categories and assigns them to a separate category. Hispanics/Latinos may be of any race.
Race / Ethnicity (NH = Non-Hispanic)	Pop 2000	Pop 2010	Pop 2020	% 2000	% 2010	% 2020
White alone (NH)	7,274	5,374	4,597	61.99%	56.94%	49.76%
Black or African American alone (NH)	4,151	3,627	3,669	35.38%	38.43%	39.72%
Native American or Alaska Native alone (NH)	6	9	19	0.05%	0.10%	0.21%
Asian alone (NH)	21	41	40	0.18%	0.43%	0.43%
Native Hawaiian or Pacific Islander alone (NH)	1	2	2	0.01%	0.02%	0.02%
Other race alone (NH)	16	12	51	0.14%	0.13%	0.55%
Mixed race or Multiracial (NH)	148	248	479	1.26%	2.63%	5.19%
Hispanic or Latino (any race)	117	125	381	1.00%	1.32%	4.12%
Total	11,734	9,438	9,238	100.00%	100.00%	100.00%

=== 2020 census ===
As of the 2020 census, Aliquippa had a population of 9,238 and a median age of 42.3 years.

20.8% of residents were under the age of 18 and 20.6% were 65 years of age or older. For every 100 females there were 86.7 males, and for every 100 females age 18 and over there were 85.0 males age 18 and over.

99.8% of residents lived in urban areas, while 0.2% lived in rural areas.

There were 4,250 households in Aliquippa, of which 24.2% had children under the age of 18 living in them. Of all households, 24.8% were married-couple households, 26.3% were households with a male householder and no spouse or partner present, and 41.6% were households with a female householder and no spouse or partner present. About 40.7% of all households were made up of individuals and 16.4% had someone living alone who was 65 years of age or older.

There were 5,015 housing units, of which 15.3% were vacant. The homeowner vacancy rate was 1.9% and the rental vacancy rate was 14.5%.

Racial composition as of the 2020 census
Race	Number	Percent
White	4,661	50.5%
Black or African American	3,689	39.9%
American Indian and Alaska Native	20	0.2%
Asian	40	0.4%
Native Hawaiian and Other Pacific Islander	5	0.1%
Some other race	228	2.5%
Two or more races	595	6.4%

=== 2010 census ===
As of the 2010 census, the city had 9,438 people. The racial makeup of the city was 57.6% White, 38.6% Black or African American, 0.1% Native American, 0.4% Asian, and 2.8% were two or more races. 1.3% of the population was of Hispanic or Latino ancestry.

=== 2000 census ===
As of the 2000 census, there were 11,734 people, 5,124 households, and 3,176 families residing in the city. The population density was 2,867.7 inhabitants per square mile (1,107.2/km^{2}). There were 5,843 housing units at an average density of 1,428.0 per square mile (551.4/km^{2}). The racial makeup was 62.59% White, 35.52% African American, 0.07% Native American, 0.18% Asian, 0.03% Pacific Islander, 0.18% from other races, and 1.43% from two or more races. Hispanic or Latino of any race were 1.00% of the population.

There were 5,124 households, out of which 24.4% had children under the age of 18 living with them, 35.7% were married couples living together, 21.6% had a female householder with no husband present, and 38.0% were non-families. Of all households 35.0% were made up of individuals, and 17.1% had someone living alone who was 65 years of age or older. The average household size was 2.27 and the average family size was 2.92.

In the city, the population was spread out, with 23.5% under the age of 18, 7.6% from 18 to 24, 25.5% from 25 to 44, 20.9% from 45 to 64, and 22.5% who were 65 years of age or older. The median age was 40 years. For every 100 females, there were 82.7 males. For every 100 females age 18 and over, there were 77.2 males.

The median income for a household in the city was $25,113, and the median income for a family was $34,003. Males had a median income of $27,954 versus $21,358 for females. The per capita income for the city was $13,718. About 17.7% of families and 21.7% of the population were below the poverty line, including 36.3% of those under age 18 and 10.9% of those age 65 or over.

== Education ==
The city's residents are served by the public Aliquippa School District, which includes Aliquippa Junior/Senior High School and Aliquippa Elementary School. Children may also choose to attend an area public charter school.

== Notable people ==
- Gust Avrakotos, Central Intelligence Agency operative
- Jon Baldwin, National Football League (NFL) player
- Tommie Campbell, NFL player
- Daniel Chamovitz, biologist, 7th president of Ben-Gurion University of the Negev
- Francis J. D'Eramo, judge at the United States Virgin Islands Superior Court on St. Croix.
- Mike Ditka, NFL player and coach
- Tony Dorsett, NFL player
- Kenny Easterday, star of the Canadian movie Kenny (1988)
- Tito Francona, Major League Baseball player
- Sean Gilbert, NFL player
- Frank Gnup, Canadian football player and coach
- Nate Guenin, National Hockey League player
- Frank Hribar, NFL player
- Connie Izay, nurse, actress, technical advisor on medical television programs
- Ty Law, NFL player
- Joe Letteri, visual effects artist, five time Oscar winner
- Henry Mancini, composer ("Moon River" and "The Pink Panther Theme"), born in Cleveland, raised in Aliquippa
- Pete Maravich, basketball player
- Press Maravich, basketball coach
- Demetria Martinez, poet and author
- Felicia Mason, author
- Doc Medich, MLB pitcher
- Paul Posluszny, NFL player
- Darrelle Revis, football player
- Joe Rock, MLB pitcher
- Aaron Shust, contemporary Christian music artist
- Jesse Steinfeld, Surgeon General of the United States
- Pete Suder, MLB player
- Edward Surratt, confessed serial killer and rapist from the 1970s
- David Urban, lawyer, political advisor, and commentator
- Shatori Walker-Kimbrough, WNBA shooting guard
- Robert Wykes, classical flautist
- Jordan Whitehead, football player

== See also ==
- List of cities and towns along the Ohio River
