= Aliquippa Junior/Senior High School =

Location
- 100 Harding Avenue; Aliquippa, Pennsylvania 15001; United States
- 40.6114°N 80.2586°W

Information
- Type: Public, Coeducational high school
- Established: 1924
- Status: Open
- School district: Aliquippa School District
- Local authority: Aliquippa School District
- School code: 420213007336
- Principal: Stacey Alexander
- Teaching staff: 33.50 (on an FTE basis)
- Grades: 7-12
- Enrollment: 430 (2023-2024)
- Student to teacher ratio: 12.84
- Campus type: Large Suburb
- Colors: Red and Black
- Song: “Wave Red and Black” (1928)
- Athletics conference: Western Pennsylvania Interscholastic Athletic League
- Sports: Football, volleyball, basketball, wrestling, baseball, softball, track and field
- Team name: Quips
- Rival: Ambridge Area High School Beaver Falls High School Central Valley High School
- Yearbook: Quippian
- Feeder schools: Aliquippa Elementary School
- Website: quipsd.org

Aliquippa Junior/Senior High School is a public high school in Aliquippa, Pennsylvania. It is the only high school in the Aliquippa School District. Athletic teams compete as the Aliquippa Quips in the Western Pennsylvania Interscholastic Athletic League (WPIAL).

In 2009, the middle school building that housed grades 5–8 was renovated to house grades 7–12 and the elementary school building that housed grades K-4 was renovated to house grades K-6. The former high school building, built in 1924, was demolished in 2009.

== History ==
=== 20th century ===
On June 7, 1909, the Woodlawn School District was formed to provide education to the growing population of Woodlawn, which was later annexed into Aliquippa. In 1910, Highland School located in the Plan 6 area of Woodlawn was opened and, in 1911, Logstown School was constructed as well.

The first high school students were housed in elementary schools or sent to Beaver for senior classes and graduation, in 1913 the first senior class graduated from the Logstown building and whose names are as follows: Lehman Howard, Elvira Davis, Carol Howard, Eleanor Calhoun, Edwin Davis, and Ruth Scott. Shortly after that a two-story building was erected on the foot of the Plan 12 hill and was dedicated as Woodlawn High School. The first graduating class from that school was the Class of 1914 and its members were Dewitt Baker, Rose Eberlie, Helen McGaughy, Alda Johnson, Ruth Stevenson, Orie Cochran, and Joseph Cochran. In 1924, a new high school was erected on the hilltop overlooking the Franklin Avenue Business District. The school consisted of two wings which included 34 classrooms, laboratories, and offices and shortly after that a second building phase followed the construction of a gymnasium and the first part of a vocational shop on the hill above the school was completed. Named Harding High School after the late President Warren G. Harding who died in office during its construction, it was renamed Aliquippa High School on June 8, 1930, due to the merger of the Boroughs of Woodlawn and Aliquippa two years earlier in 1928.

Aliquippa High School continued serving the community for more than 80 years until 2009. At that time the structure was in a state of deterioration and needed to be either remodeled or replaced. The Aliquippa School District took remodeling the school into consideration, but the project would have cost $63 million and due to the heavy loss of tax revenue because of the closing of the Jones and Laughlin Steel Company in 1985 and the heavy population & school enrollment loss the school could not afford the project. The school decided to cut down from three buildings to two by renovating Aliquippa Elementary School to house Grades K-6 instead of K-4 and renovating Aliquippa Middle School to house Grades 7-12 instead of 5-8 and it was to be renamed Aliquippa Junior/Senior High School. Aliquippa High School would be razed since there was nothing that could be done to the building. The Class of 2009 was the final graduating class from AHS and the Class of 2010 was the first class to graduate from the new Aliquippa Junior/Senior High School. Over 20,000 people graduated from Aliquippa High School from 1925 to 2009.

The Aliquippa Jr/Sr High School was built in 1959 as the Aliquippa Junior High School. The school was built by orders of the Aliquippa Board of School Directors due to the rising enrollment in the District. The school was built from 1958 to 1959 and was built to house 1,000 Students. The school was estimated to cost $750,000 to $850,000. The Junior High School was operated from 1959 to 1985 when by the decision of the Aliquippa School Board, the grades would be realigned. Aliquippa's population was declining due to the collapse of the steel industry, and the school district's enrollment dropped from 3,900 in 1973 to 1,500 that year. The school board decided to put grades Kindergarten through Sixth in the then New Sheffield Elementary School (currently Aliquippa Elementary School), and put grades Seventh through Twelfth Grades at the Aliquippa High School, renaming it Aliquippa Junior/Senior High School and closing the over 30-year-old Junior High School. This remained until 1991 when due to a spike in enrollment, the Aliquippa School Board voted to reopen the Junior High School after being closed for six years. But in order to reopen the Junior High, the building had to be brought up to Code by the Regulations of the Pennsylvania Department of Labor and Department of Education, County of Beaver, and the City of Aliquippa. After the work was finished, the school was dedicated. Renovations included a new air conditioning system, doors to the classrooms/building, new kitchen equipment, floors, lights, ceiling panels, paint, and a new main school entrance.

=== 21st century ===
The school was renamed Aliquippa Middle School and operated normally until 2008. After the Aliquippa School Board decided to once again realign the grades. Aliquippa Elementary School now houses kindergarten through sixth grade and Aliquippa Middle School houses grades seven through twelve and was renamed Aliquippa Junior/Senior High School. Aliquippa High School, built in 1924, would be demolished.

The Class of 2009 was the last graduating class from the former Aliquippa High School. As of the 2019-2020 school year, Aliquippa Junior/Senior High School houses 405 pupils in grades 7 through 12.

== Extracurriculars ==
The school offers clubs, activities and sports. The Aliquippa Quips compete in the 3A of the Western Pennsylvania Interscholastic Athletic League.

Aliquippa is the only high school in America with three alumni in the Pro Football Hall of Fame.

== Notable alumni ==
- Joe Beggs (class of 1929) – Major League Baseball pitcher
- Press Maravich (class of 1933) – NCAA basketball coach and father of "Pistol" Pete Maravich
- Henry Mancini (class of 1942) – composer and winner of a record 20 Grammy Awards
- Jesse Steinfeld (class of 1945) – eleventh Surgeon General of the United States from 1969 to 1973
- Hal Jeter (class of 1963) – American Basketball Association player with the Washington Caps
- Gust Avrakotos (class of 1955) – United States Central Intelligence Agency operative who received notoriety from George Crile's book Charlie Wilson's War: The Extraordinary Story of the Largest Covert Operation in History
- Mike Ditka (class of 1957) – sports commentator, National Football League (NFL) tight end, and coach of the Chicago Bears and New Orleans Saints; Super Bowl champion as both a player and coach
- Sean Gilbert (class of 1991) – NFL defensive tackle
- Ty Law (class of 1992) – NFL cornerback, three-time Super Bowl champion
- Darrelle Revis (class of 2004) – NFL cornerback, Super Bowl champion
- Tommie Campbell (class of 2005) – NFL cornerback
- Jon Baldwin (class of 2008) – NFL wide receiver
- MJ Devonshire (class of 2019) – NFL cornerback
- Zuriah Fisher (class of 2020) – college football defensive end
