= Alikhani =

Alikhani (Persian: علي خاني) may refer to:

- Alikhani (surname), list of people with the surname
- Alikhani, Iran, a village in Kermanshah Province, Iran
- Alikhani, Hormozgan, a village in Hormozgan Province, Iran

== See also ==
- Mehr Alikhani, a village in Lorestan Province, Iran
- Aha Khani, a village in Hormozgan Province, Iran
