= Alikhani (surname) =

Alikhani is a surname of Persian origin. Notable people with the surname include:

- Alinaghi Alikhani (1929–2019), Iranian economist
- Ehsan Alikhani (born 1982), Iranian television presenter and director
- Ghodratollah Alikhani (born c. 1939), Iranian Shi'a cleric and politician
- Hossein Alikhani (died 2008), Iranian businessman
- Mohammad Alikhani (politician), Iranian politician
- Yousef Alikhani (born 1975), Iranian writer
