= French and Indian War =

North American theater of the Seven Years' War

French and Indian War (Note: The term Indian has been used in keeping with article name guidelines because of the historical nature of the article and the precision of the name. The use of the name also provides relevant context about the era of the war, specifically one in which Indigenous peoples in North America were homogeneously referred to as Indians. Use of Indian is limited throughout the article to proper nouns and references to government legislation.)
- Part of the Seven Years' War and the Sixty Years' War
- The war theater
Date	28 May 1754 – 7 October 1763 (9 years, 4 months, 1 week and 2 days)
Location	North America
Result	British victory
Territorial changes	France cedes New France east of the Mississippi River to Great Britain, retaining Saint Pierre and Miquelon, and transfers Louisiana to Spain.

Belligerents
Great Britain; British America; Pro-British Indigenous nations	France; New France; Canada; Pro-French Indigenous nations

Commanders and leaders
Jeffery Amherst; Edward Braddock †; James Wolfe †; John Campbell; James Abercrombie; Edward Boscawen; George Washington; John Forbes; George Monro; William Johnson; Tanacharison; Sayenqueraghta	Louis de Montcalm †; Pierre de Rigaud; François de Bourlamaque; Chevalier de Lévis (POW); Jean Erdman (POW); François de Lignery †; Michel de Menneville; Daniel de Beaujeu †; Joseph de Jumonville †; Captain Jacobs †; Pontiac; Shingas; Killbuck

Strength
46,500 regulars; Militia (peak strength, 1758)	10,000 regulars (troupes de la terre and troupes de la marine, peak strength, 1757); 15,000 militia

Casualties and losses
3,000 regulars killed in action or died of wounds, 10,400 died of disease; 11,000+ provincial troops and Native allies died of all causes; Total: 25,000 dead	Unknown

The French and Indian War (Note: Known by Francophone Canadians as La Guerre de la Conquête or War of the Conquest) (1754–1763) was a conflict in North America between Great Britain and France, along with their respective Indigenous allies. Historians generally consider it part of the global Seven Years' War, which lasted from 1756 to 1763, although in the United States it is often viewed as a distinct conflict unassociated with any larger European war.

Britain and France had been officially at peace following the Treaty of Aix-la-Chapelle in 1748, but tensions over trade continued in North America. These tensions culminated in a dispute over the Forks of the Ohio, and the related French Fort Duquesne which controlled them. In May 1754, this led to the Battle of Jumonville Glen, when Virginia militia led by George Washington ambushed a French patrol.

In 1755, Edward Braddock, the new Commander-in-Chief, North America, planned a four-way attack on the French. None succeeded, while the Braddock Expedition ended in disaster at the Battle of the Monongahela on July 9, with Braddock himself dying of his wounds a few days later. From 1755 to 1757, further British operations in Pennsylvania and New York failed, but were offset by the British capture of Fort Beauséjour on the border between British Nova Scotia and French Acadia. Over the next nine years, French settlers were expelled from Acadia and replaced by those from New England.

The Seven Years' War began in 1756, and a number of disastrous campaigns in 1757, including the Louisbourg Expedition and Siege of Fort William Henry led to the fall of the British government. The new Prime Minister, William Pitt, significantly increased British military resources in the colonies when France was struggling to support their limited forces in New France, preferring to concentrate their forces in Europe. Between 1758 and 1760, the British launched a campaign to capture French Canada, taking Quebec in 1759, then Montreal the following year. This largely ended fighting in North America.

In accordance with the 1763 Treaty of Paris, France ceded its Canadian possessions to Britain, along with its claim to territories east of the Mississippi River. France also gave French Louisiana west of the Mississippi to their ally Spain in the separate Treaty of Fontainebleau, in compensation for their losses to Britain. The French presence in North America was reduced to the islands of Saint Pierre and Miquelon, confirming Britain's position as the dominant colonial power.

== Nomenclature ==
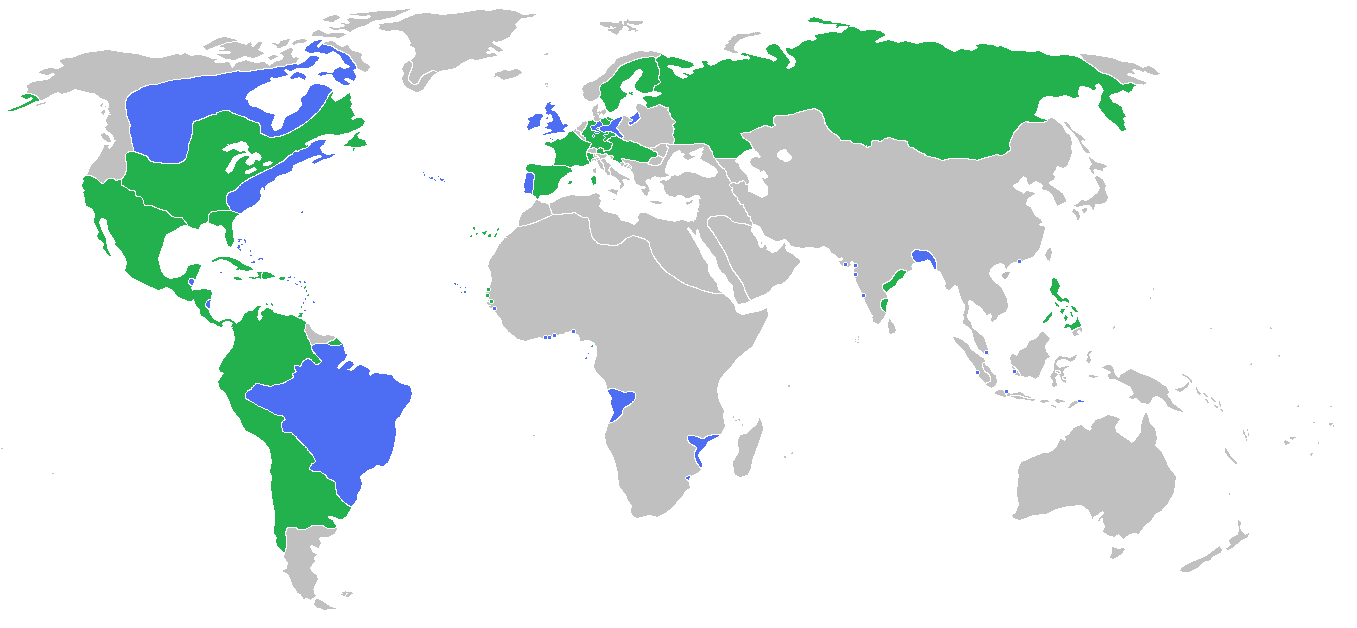
Belligerents during the Seven Years' War. Canadians and Europeans view the French and Indian War as a theater of the Seven Years' War, while Americans view it a separate conflict.

In British America, wars were often named after the sitting British monarch, such as King William's War or Queen Anne's War. There had already been a King George's War in the 1740s during the reign of King George II, so British colonists named this conflict after their opponents, and it became known as the French and Indian War. This continues as the standard name for the war in the United States, although indigenous peoples fought on both sides of the conflict. It also led into the Seven Years' War overseas, a much larger conflict between France and Great Britain that did not involve the American colonies; some historians make a connection between the French and Indian War and the Seven Years' War overseas, but most residents of the United States consider them as two separate conflicts—only one of which involved the American colonies, and American historians generally use the traditional name. Less frequently used names for the war include the Fourth Intercolonial War and the Great War for the Empire.

In Europe, the French and Indian War is conflated into the Seven Years' War and not given a separate name. "Seven Years" refers to events in Europe, from the official declaration of war in 1756—two years after the French and Indian War had started—to the signing of the peace treaty in 1763. The French and Indian War in America, by contrast, was largely concluded in six years from the Battle of Jumonville Glen in 1754 to the capture of Montreal in 1760. Canadians conflate both the European and American conflicts into the Seven Years' War (Guerre de Sept Ans). French Canadians also use the term "War of Conquest" (Guerre de la Conquête), since it is the war in which New France was conquered by the British and became part of the British Empire. In Quebec, this term was promoted by popular historians Jacques Lacoursière and Denis Vaugeois, who borrowed from the ideas of Maurice Séguin in considering this war as a dramatic tipping point of French Canadian identity and nationhood.

== Background ==
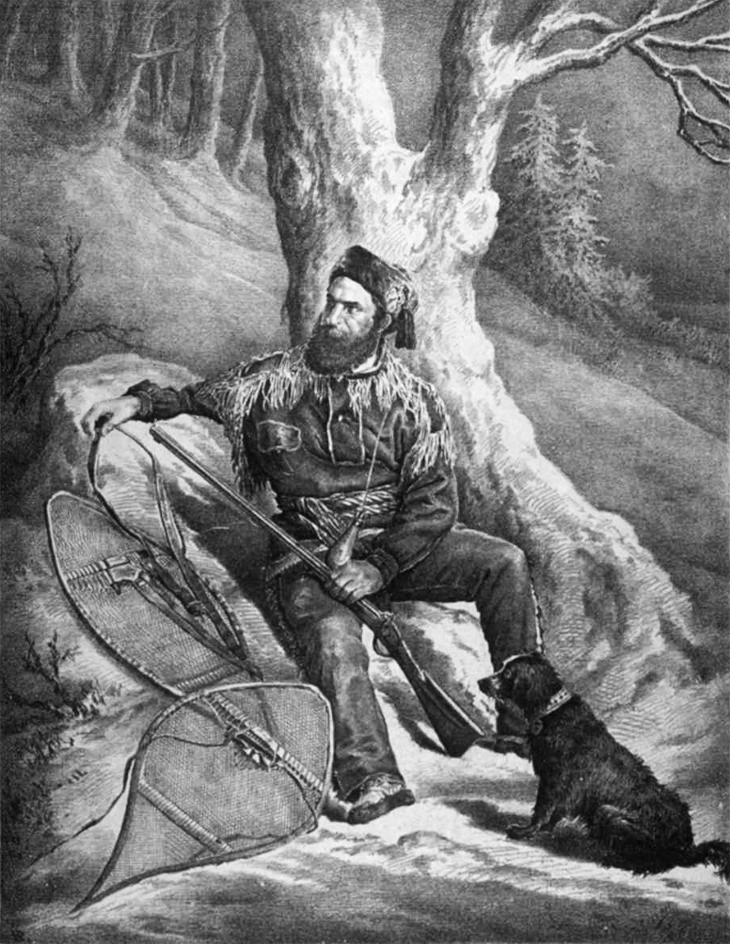
The coureurs des bois were French-Canadian fur traders, who did business with natives throughout the Mississippi and St. Lawrence watershed.

At this time, North America east of the Mississippi River was largely claimed by either Great Britain or France. Large areas had no colonial settlements. The French population numbered about 75,000 and was heavily concentrated along the St. Lawrence River valley, with some also in Acadia (present-day New Brunswick and parts of Nova Scotia), including Île Royale (Cape Breton Island). Fewer lived in New Orleans; Biloxi, Mississippi; Mobile, Alabama; and small settlements in the Illinois Country, hugging the east side of the Mississippi River and its tributaries. French fur traders and trappers traveled throughout the St. Lawrence and Mississippi watersheds, did business with local Indian tribes, and often married Indian women. Traders married daughters of chiefs, creating high-ranking unions.

British settlers outnumbered the French 20 to 1 with a population of about 1.5 million ranged along the Atlantic coast of the continent from Nova Scotia and the Colony of Newfoundland in the north to the Province of Georgia in the south. Many of the older colonies' land claims extended arbitrarily far to the west, as the extent of the continent was unknown at the time when their provincial charters were granted. Their population centers were along the coast, but the settlements were growing into the interior. The British captured Nova Scotia from France in 1713, which still had a significant French-speaking population. Britain also claimed Rupert's Land where the Hudson's Bay Company traded for furs with local Indian tribes.

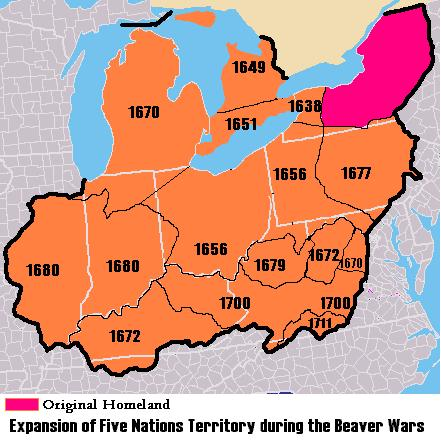
Iroquois expansion, 1711. By the mid-18th century, the Iroquois Confederacy had expanded from Upstate New York to the Ohio Country.

Between the French and British colonists, large areas were dominated by Indian tribes. To the north, the Mi'kmaq and the Abenakis were engaged in Father Le Loutre's War and still held sway in parts of Nova Scotia, Acadia, and the eastern portions of the province of Canada, as well as much of Maine. The Iroquois Confederation dominated much of upstate New York and the Ohio Country, although Ohio also included Algonquian-speaking populations of Delaware and Shawnee, as well as Iroquoian-speaking Mingo. These tribes were formally under Iroquois rule and were limited by them in their authority to make agreements. The Iroquois Confederation initially held a stance of neutrality to ensure continued trade with both French and British. Though maintaining this stance proved difficult as the Iroquois Confederation tribes sided and supported French or British causes depending on which side provided the most beneficial trade.

The Southeast interior was dominated by Siouan-speaking Catawbas, Muskogee-speaking Creeks and Choctaw, and the Iroquoian-speaking Cherokee tribes. When war broke out, the French colonists used their trading connections to recruit fighters from tribes in western portions of the Great Lakes region, which was not directly subject to the conflict between the French and British; these included the Wyandots, Mississaugas, Ojibwas, Winnebagos, and Potawatomi.

The British colonists were supported in the war by the Iroquois Six Nations and also by the Cherokees, until differences sparked the Anglo-Cherokee War in 1758. In 1758, the Province of Pennsylvania successfully negotiated the Treaty of Easton in which a number of tribes in the Ohio Country promised neutrality in exchange for land concessions and other considerations. Most of the other northern tribes sided with the French, their primary trading partner and supplier of arms. The Creeks and Cherokees were subject to diplomatic efforts by both the French and British to gain either their support or neutrality in the conflict.

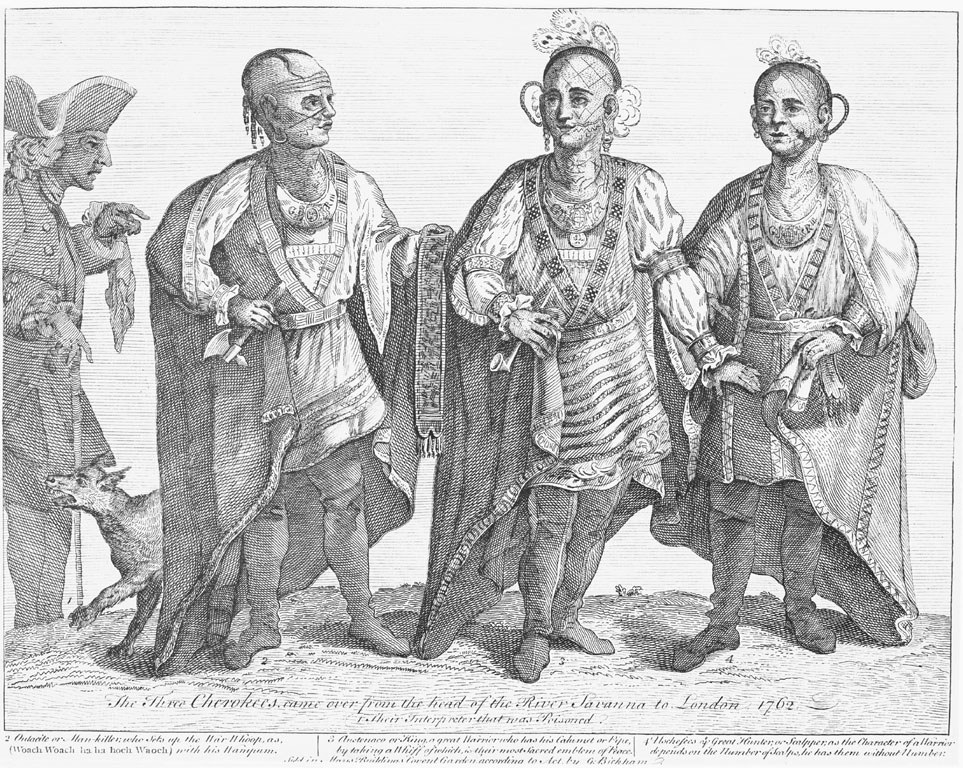
Three Cherokee chiefs, c. 1762. The Cherokee were subject to diplomatic efforts from the British and French to gain their support or neutrality in the event of a conflict.

At this time, Spain claimed only the province of Florida in eastern America. It controlled Cuba and other territories in the West Indies that became military objectives in the Seven Years' War. Florida's European population was a few hundred, concentrated in St. Augustine.

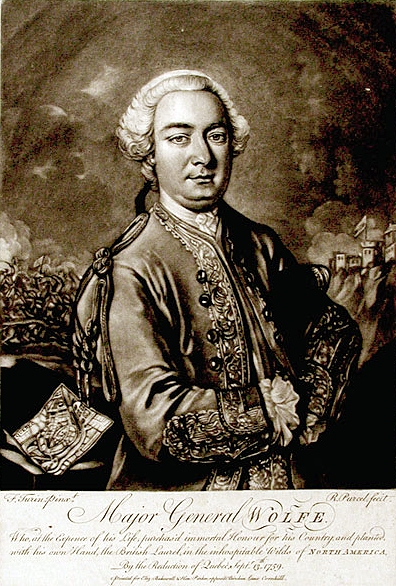
General James Wolfe, British commander

There were no French regular army troops stationed in America at the onset of war. New France was defended by about 3,000 troupes de la marine, companies of colonial regulars (some of whom had significant woodland combat experience). The colonial government recruited militia support when needed. The British had few troops. Most of the British colonies mustered local militia companies to deal with Indian threats, generally ill trained and available only for short periods, but they did not have any standing forces. Virginia, by contrast, had a large frontier with several companies of British regulars.

When hostilities began, the British colonial governments preferred operating independently of one another and of the government in London. This situation complicated negotiations with Indian tribes, whose territories often encompassed land claimed by multiple colonies. As the war progressed, the leaders of the British Army establishment tried to impose constraints and demands on the colonial administrations.

=== Céloron's expedition ===
New France's Governor-General Roland-Michel Barrin de La Galissonière was concerned about the incursion and expanding influence in the Ohio Country of British colonial traders such as George Croghan. In June 1747, he ordered Pierre-Joseph Céloron to lead a military expedition through the area. Its objectives were:

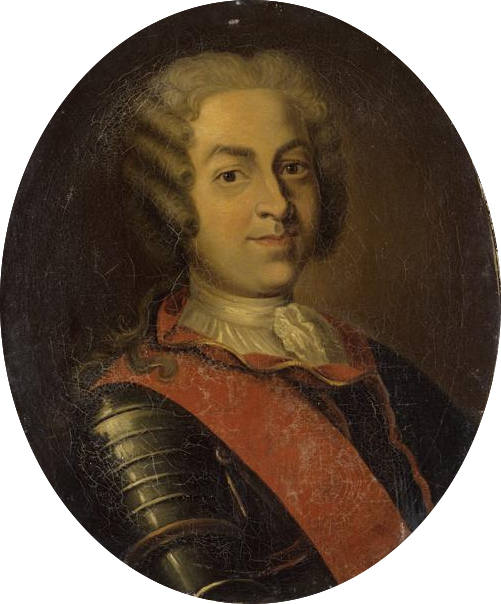
Roland-Michel Barrin de La Galissonière, Governor of New France, sent an expedition in 1749 into the Ohio Country in an attempt to assert French sovereignty.

- to reaffirm to New France's Indian allies that their trading arrangements with colonists were exclusive to those authorized by New France
- to confirm Indian assistance in asserting and maintaining the French claim to the territories which French explorers had claimed
- to discourage any alliances between Britain and local Indian tribes
- to impress the Indians with a French show of force against British colonial settler incursion, unauthorized trading expeditions, and general trespass against French claims

Céloron's expedition force consisted of about 200 Troupes de la marine and 30 Indians, and they covered about 3,000 miles (4,800 km) between June and November 1749. They went up the St. Lawrence, continued along the northern shore of Lake Ontario, crossed the portage at Niagara, and followed the southern shore of Lake Erie. At the Chautauqua Portage near Barcelona, New York, the expedition moved inland to the Allegheny River, which it followed to the site of Pittsburgh. There Céloron buried lead plates engraved with the French claim to the Ohio Country. Whenever he encountered British colonial merchants or fur-traders, he informed them of the French claims on the territory and told them to leave.

Céloron's expedition arrived at Logstown where the Indians in the area informed him that they owned the Ohio Country and that they would trade with the British colonists regardless of the French. He continued south until his expedition reached the confluence of the Ohio and the Miami rivers, which lay just south of the village of Pickawillany, the home of the Miami chief known as "Old Briton". Céloron threatened Old Briton with severe consequences if he continued to trade with British colonists, but Old Briton ignored the warning. Céloron returned disappointedly to Montreal in November 1749.

Céloron wrote an extensively detailed report. "All I can say is that the Natives of these localities are very badly disposed towards the French," he wrote, "and are entirely devoted to the English. I don't know in what way they could be brought back." Even before his return to Montreal, reports on the situation in the Ohio Country were making their way to London and Paris, each side proposing that action be taken. Massachusetts governor William Shirley was particularly forceful, stating that British colonists would not be safe as long as the French were present.

=== Negotiations ===
European colonies in North America, c. 1750. Disputes over territorial claims persisted after the end of King George's War in 1748.

The War of the Austrian Succession ended in 1748 with the signing of the Treaty of Aix-la-Chapelle, which was primarily focused on resolving issues in Europe. The issues of conflicting territorial claims between British and French colonies were turned over to a commission, but it reached no decision. Frontier areas were claimed by both sides, from Nova Scotia and Acadia in the north to the Ohio Country in the south. The disputes also extended into the Atlantic Ocean, where both powers wanted access to the rich fisheries of the Grand Banks off Newfoundland.

In 1749, the British government gave land to the Ohio Company of Virginia for the purpose of developing trade and settlements in the Ohio Country. The grant required that it settle 100 families in the territory and construct a fort for their protection. But the territory was also claimed by Pennsylvania, and both colonies began pushing for action to improve their respective claims. In 1750, Christopher Gist explored the Ohio territory, acting on behalf of both Virginia and the company, and he opened negotiations with the Indian tribes at Logstown. He completed the 1752 Treaty of Logstown in which the local Indians agreed to terms through their "Half-King" Tanacharison and an Iroquois representative. These terms included permission to build a strong house at the mouth of the Monongahela River on the modern site of Pittsburgh, Pennsylvania.

=== Escalation in Ohio Country ===
Governor-General of New France Marquis de la Jonquière died on March 17, 1752, and he was temporarily replaced by Charles le Moyne de Longueuil. His permanent replacement was to be the Marquis Duquesne, but he did not arrive in New France until 1752 to take over the post. The continuing British activity in the Ohio territories prompted Longueuil to dispatch another expedition to the area under the command of Charles Michel de Langlade, an officer in the Troupes de la Marine. Langlade was given 300 men, including French-Canadians and warriors of the Ottawa tribe. His objective was to punish the Miami people of Pickawillany for not following Céloron's orders to cease trading with the British. On June 21, the French war party attacked the trading center at Pickawillany, capturing three traders and killing 14 Miami Indians, including Old Briton. He was reportedly ritually cannibalized by some Indians in the expedition party.

==== Construction of French fortifications ====
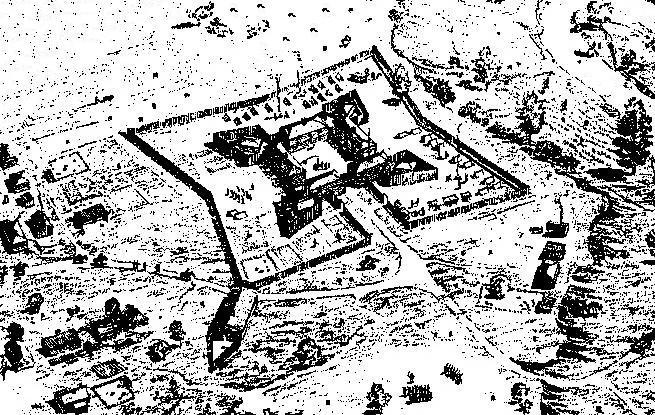
Fort Le Boeuf in 1754. In the spring of 1753, the French began to build a series of forts in the Ohio Country.

In the spring of 1753, Paul Marin de la Malgue was given command of a 2,000-man force of Troupes de la Marine and Indians. His orders were to protect the King's land in the Ohio Valley from the British. Marin followed the route that Céloron had mapped out four years earlier. Céloron, however, had limited the record of French claims to the burial of lead plates, whereas Marin constructed and garrisoned forts to protect several strategic locations. He first constructed Fort Presque Isle on Lake Erie's south shore near the future site of Erie, Pennsylvania. He then built a road to the headwaters of LeBoeuf Creek, where he constructed Fort Le Boeuf on the future site of Waterford, Pennsylvania. As he moved south, he drove off or captured British traders, alarming both the British and the Iroquois. Tanaghrisson was a chief of the Mingo, who were remnants of Iroquois and other tribes who had been driven west by colonial expansion. He intensely disliked the French whom he accused of killing and eating his father. He traveled to Fort Le Boeuf and threatened the French with military action, which Marin contemptuously dismissed.

The Iroquois sent runners to the manor of William Johnson in upstate New York, who was the British Superintendent for Indian Affairs in the New York region and beyond. Johnson was known to the Iroquois as Warraghiggey, meaning "he who does great things." He spoke their languages and had become a respected honorary member of the Iroquois Confederacy in the area, and he was made a colonel of the Iroquois in 1746; he was later commissioned as a colonel of the Western New York Militia.

The Indian representatives and Johnson met with Governor George Clinton and officials from some of the other American colonies at Albany, New York. Mohawk Chief Hendrick was the speaker of their tribal council, and he insisted that the British abide by their obligations and block French expansion. Clinton did not respond to his satisfaction, and Hendrick said that the "Covenant Chain" was broken, a long-standing friendly relationship between the Iroquois Confederacy and the British Crown.

==== Virginia's response ====
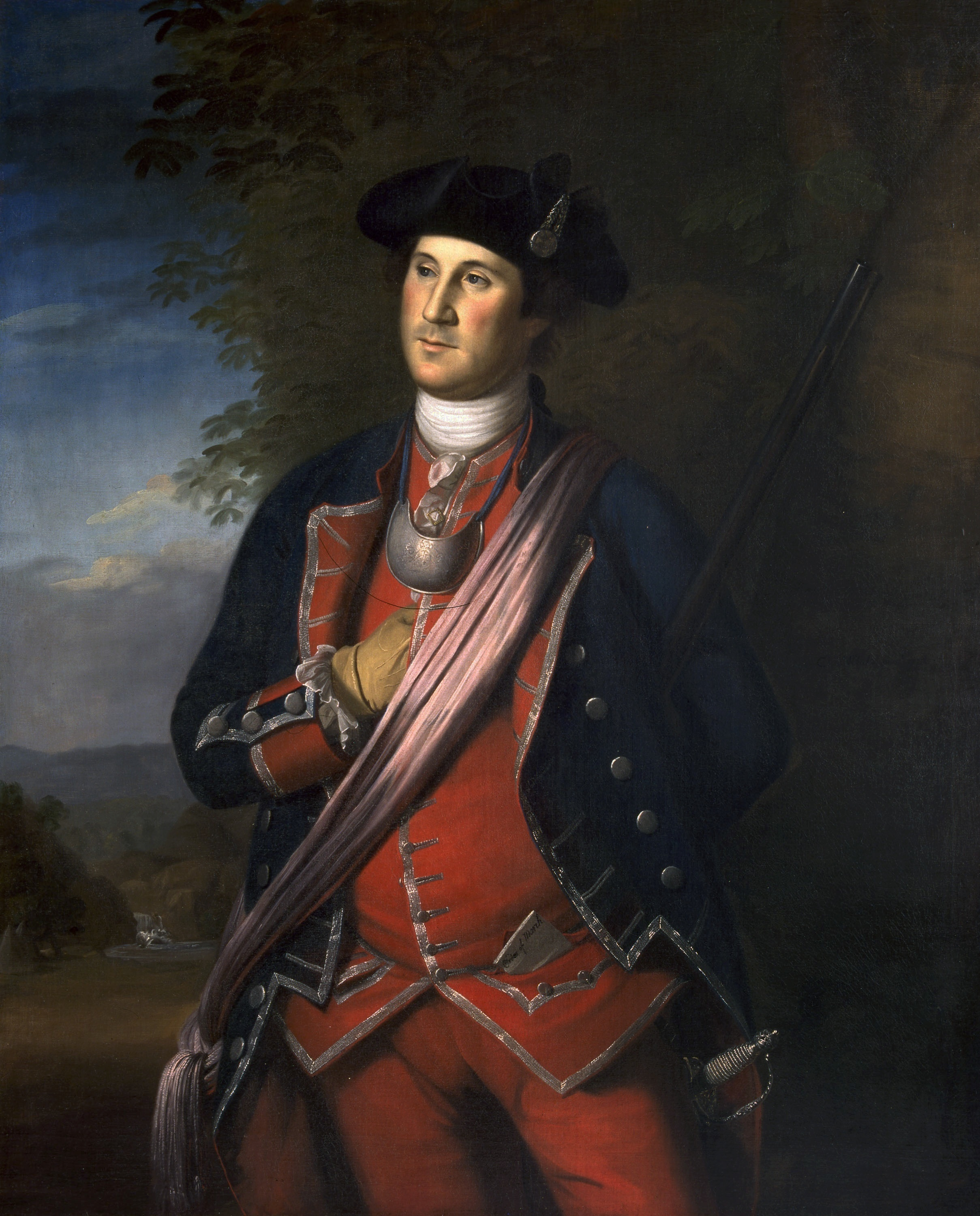
In 1754, George Washington of the Virginia Regiment was dispatched to warn the French to leave Virginian territory.

Governor Robert Dinwiddie of Virginia was an investor in the Ohio Company, which stood to lose money if the French held their claim. He ordered 21-year-old Major George Washington (whose brother was another Ohio Company investor) of the Virginia Regiment to warn the French to leave Virginia territory in October 1753. Washington left with a small party, including Jacob Van Braam as an interpreter, Christopher Gist (a company surveyor working in the area), Guyasuta (a Mingo warrior), Jeskakake (a Cayuga chief), Kaghswaghtaniunt (a Seneca leader), and Tanaghrisson. On December 12, Washington and his men reached Fort Le Boeuf.

Jacques Legardeur de Saint-Pierre succeeded Marin as commander of the French forces after Marin died on October 29, and he invited Washington to dine with him. Over dinner, Washington presented Saint-Pierre with the letter from Dinwiddie demanding an immediate French withdrawal from the Ohio Country. Saint-Pierre said, "As to the Summons you send me to retire, I do not think myself obliged to obey it." He told Washington that France's claim to the region was superior to that of the British, since René-Robert Cavelier, Sieur de La Salle had explored the Ohio Country nearly a century earlier.

Washington's party left Fort Le Boeuf early on December 16 and arrived in Williamsburg on January 16, 1754. He stated in his report, "The French had swept south", detailing the steps which they had taken to fortify the area, and their intention to fortify the confluence of the Allegheny and Monongahela rivers.

== Course of war ==
Even before Washington returned, Dinwiddie had sent a company of 40 men under William Trent to that point where they began construction of a small stockaded fort in the early months of 1754. Governor Duquesne sent additional French forces under Claude-Pierre Pécaudy de Contrecœur to relieve Saint-Pierre during the same period, and Contrecœur led 500 men south from Fort Venango on April 5, 1754. These forces arrived at the fort on April 16, but Contrecœur generously allowed Trent's small company to withdraw. He purchased their construction tools to continue building what became Fort Duquesne.

=== Early engagements ===
Dinwiddie had ordered Washington to lead a larger force to assist Trent in his work, and Washington learned of Trent's retreat while he was en route. Mingo sachem Tanaghrisson had promised support to the British, so Washington continued toward Fort Duquesne and met with him. He then learned of a French scouting party in the area from a warrior sent by Tanaghrisson, so he added Tanaghrisson's dozen Mingo warriors to his own party. Washington's combined force of 52 ambushed 40 Canadiens (French colonists of New France) on the morning of May 28 in what became known as the Battle of Jumonville Glen. They killed many of the Canadians, including their commanding officer Joseph Coulon de Jumonville, whose head was reportedly split open by Tanaghrisson with a tomahawk. Historian Fred Anderson suggests that Tanaghrisson was acting to gain the support of the British and to regain authority over his own people. They had been inclined to support the French, with whom they had long trading relationships. One of Tanaghrisson's men told Contrecoeur that Jumonville had been killed by British musket fire. Historians generally consider the Battle of Jumonville Glen as the opening battle of the French and Indian War in North America, and the start of hostilities in the Ohio valley.

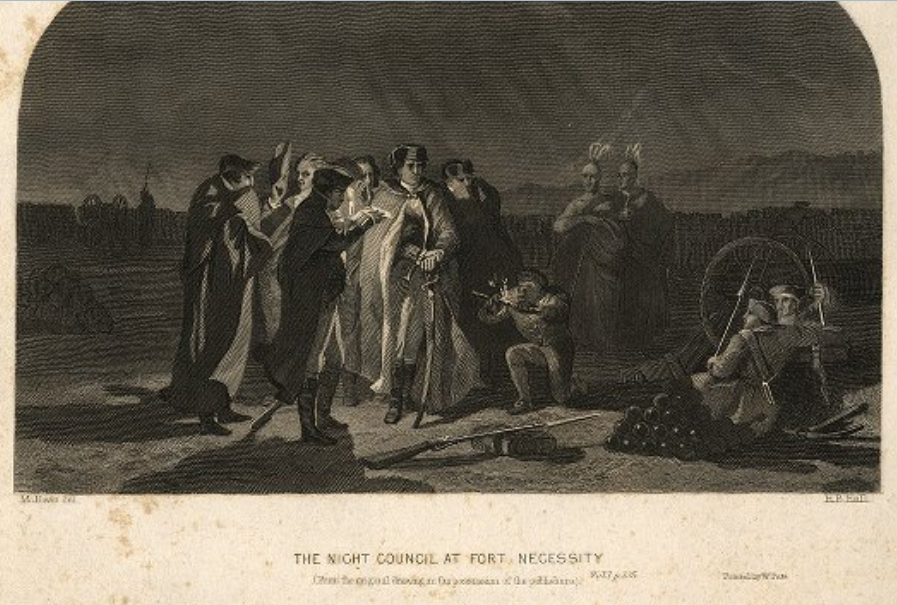
Washington with his war council during the Battle of Fort Necessity. After deliberations, it was decided to withdraw, and surrender the fort.

Following the battle, Washington pulled back several miles and established Fort Necessity, which the Canadians attacked under the command of Jumonville's brother at the Battle of Fort Necessity on July 3. Washington surrendered and negotiated a withdrawal under arms. One of his men reported that the Canadian force was accompanied by Shawnee, Delaware, and Mingo warriors—just those whom Tanaghrisson was seeking to influence.

News of the two battles reached England in August. After several months of negotiations, the government of the Duke of Newcastle decided to send an army expedition the following year to dislodge the French. They chose Major General Edward Braddock to lead the expedition. Word of the British military plans leaked to France well before Braddock's departure for North America. In response, King Louis XV dispatched six regiments to New France under the command of Baron Dieskau in 1755. The British sent out their fleet in February 1755, intending to blockade French ports, but the French fleet had already sailed. Admiral Edward Hawke detached a fast squadron to North America in an attempt to intercept them.

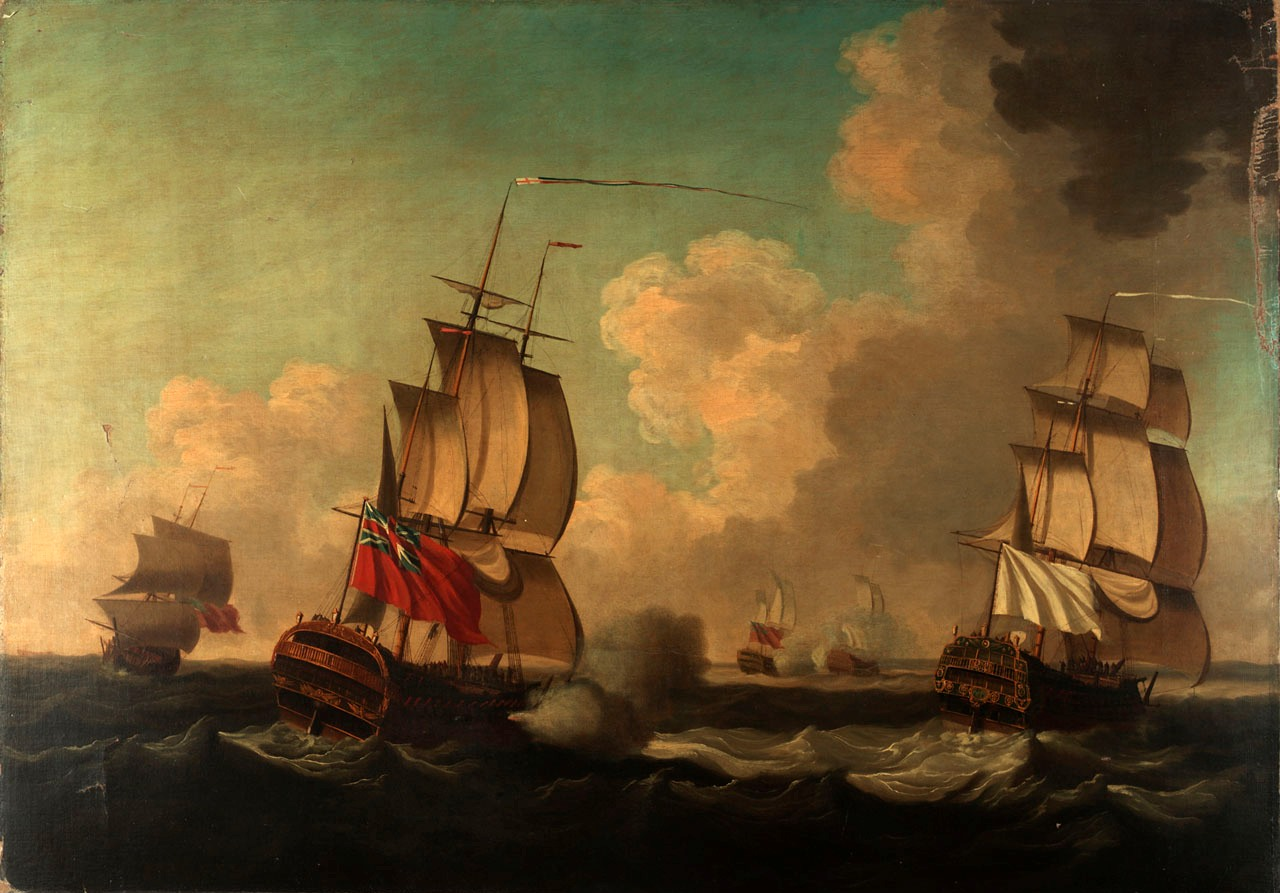
In June 1755, the British captured French naval ships sent to provide war matériel to the Acadian and Mi'kmaw militias in Nova Scotia.

In a second British action, Admiral Edward Boscawen fired on the French ship Alcide on June 8, 1755, capturing her and two troop ships. The British harassed French shipping throughout 1755, seizing ships and capturing seamen. These actions contributed to the eventual formal declarations of war in spring 1756.

An early important political response to the opening of hostilities was the convening of the Albany Congress in June and July, 1754. The goal of the congress was to formalize a unified front in trade and negotiations with the Indians, since the allegiance of the various tribes and nations was seen to be pivotal in the war that was unfolding. The plan that the delegates agreed to was neither ratified by the colonial legislatures nor approved by the Crown. Nevertheless, the format of the congress and many specifics of the plan became the prototype for confederation during the War of Independence.

=== British campaigns, 1755 ===
The British formed an aggressive plan of operations for 1755. General Braddock was to lead the expedition to Fort Duquesne, while Massachusetts governor William Shirley was given the task of fortifying Fort Oswego and attacking Fort Niagara. Sir William Johnson was to capture Fort St. Frédéric at Crown Point, New York, and Lieutenant Colonel Robert Monckton was to capture Fort Beauséjour to the east on the frontier between Nova Scotia and Acadia.

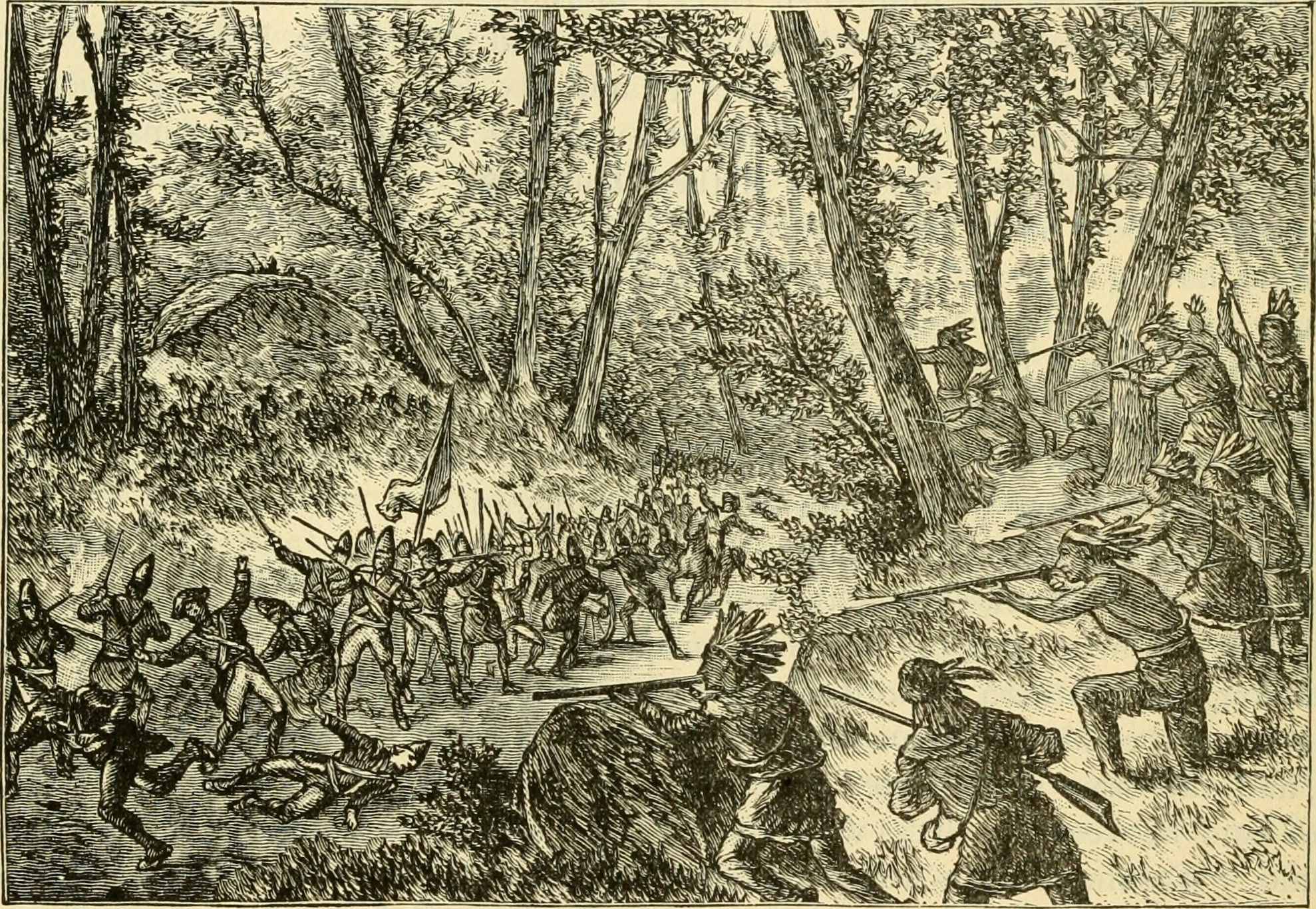
British forces under fire from the French and Indian forces at Monongahela, when the Braddock expedition failed to take Fort Duquesne.

Braddock led about 1,500 army troops and provincial militia on the Braddock expedition in June 1755 to take Fort Duquesne, with George Washington as one of his aides. The expedition was a disaster. It was attacked by French regulars, Canadian Militiamen, and Indian warriors ambushing them from hiding places up in trees and behind logs, and Braddock called for a retreat. He was killed and approximately 1,000 British soldiers were killed or injured. The remaining 500 British troops retreated to Virginia, led by Washington. Washington and Thomas Gage played key roles in organizing the retreat—two future opponents in the American Revolutionary War.

The British government initiated a plan to increase their military capability in preparation for war following news of Braddock's defeat and the start of parliament's session in November 1755. Among the early legislative measures were the Recruiting Act 1756, the Commissions to Foreign Protestants Act 1756 for the Royal American Regiment, the Navigation Act 1756, and the Continuance of Laws Act 1756. England passed the Naval Prize Act 1756 following the proclamation of war on May 17 to allow the capture of ships and establish privateering.

The French acquired a copy of the British war plans, including the activities of Shirley and Johnson. Shirley's efforts to fortify Oswego were bogged down in logistical difficulties, exacerbated by his inexperience in managing large expeditions. In conjunction, he was made aware that the French were massing for an attack on Fort Oswego in his absence when he planned to attack Fort Niagara. As a response, he left garrisons at Oswego, Fort Bull, and Fort Williams, the last two located on the Oneida Carry between the Mohawk River and Wood Creek at Rome, New York. Supplies were cached at Fort Bull for use in the projected attack on Niagara.

Johnson's expedition was better organized than Shirley's, which was noticed by New France's governor the Marquis de Vaudreuil. Vaudreuil had been concerned about the extended supply line to the forts on the Ohio, and he had sent Baron Dieskau to lead the defenses at Frontenac against Shirley's expected attack. Vaudreuil saw Johnson as the larger threat and sent Dieskau to Fort St. Frédéric to meet that threat. Dieskau planned to attack the British encampment at Fort Edward at the upper end of navigation on the Hudson River, but Johnson had strongly fortified it, and Dieskau's Indian support was reluctant to attack. The two forces finally met in the bloody Battle of Lake George between Fort Edward and Fort William Henry. The battle ended inconclusively, with both sides withdrawing from the field. Johnson's advance stopped at Fort William Henry, and the French withdrew to Ticonderoga Point, where they began the construction of Fort Carillon (later renamed Fort Ticonderoga after the British captured it in 1759).

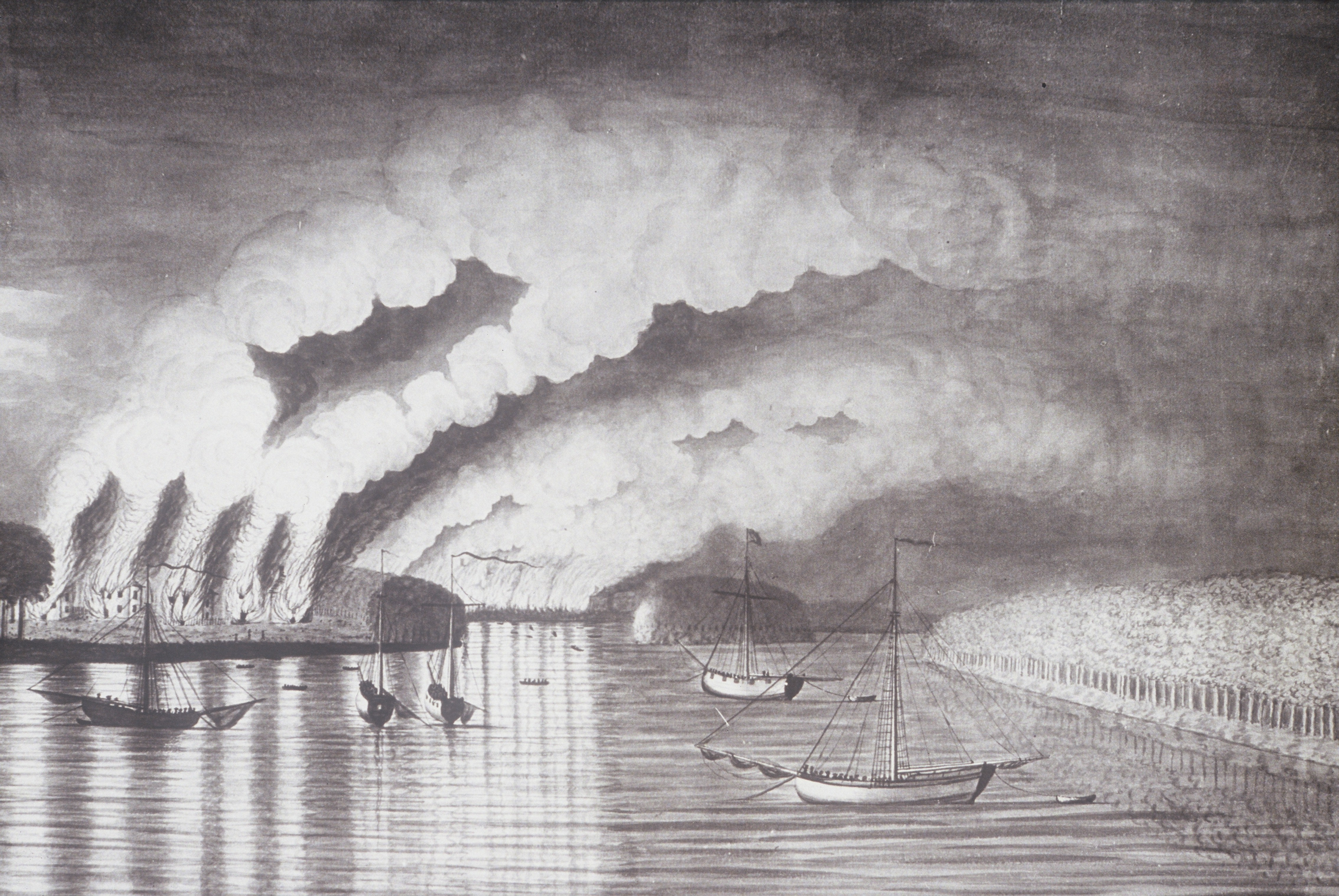
British raid on the Acadian settlement of Grimross. Efforts to undermine the French Fortress of Louisbourg resulted in the forcible removal of the Acadians.

Colonel Monckton captured Fort Beauséjour in June 1755 in the sole British success that year, cutting off the French Fortress Louisbourg from land-based reinforcements. To cut vital supplies to Louisbourg, Nova Scotia's Governor Charles Lawrence ordered the deportation of the French-speaking Acadian population from the area. Monckton's forces, including companies of Rogers' Rangers, forcibly removed thousands of Acadians, chasing down many who resisted and sometimes committing atrocities. Cutting off supplies to Louisbourg led to its demise. The Acadian resistance was sometimes quite stiff, in concert with Indian allies including the Mi'kmaq, with ongoing frontier raids against Dartmouth and Lunenburg, among others. The only clashes of any size were at Petitcodiac in 1755 and at Bloody Creek near Annapolis Royal in 1757, other than the campaigns to expel the Acadians ranging around the Bay of Fundy, on the Petitcodiac and St. John rivers, and Île Saint-Jean.

=== French victories, 1756–1757 ===
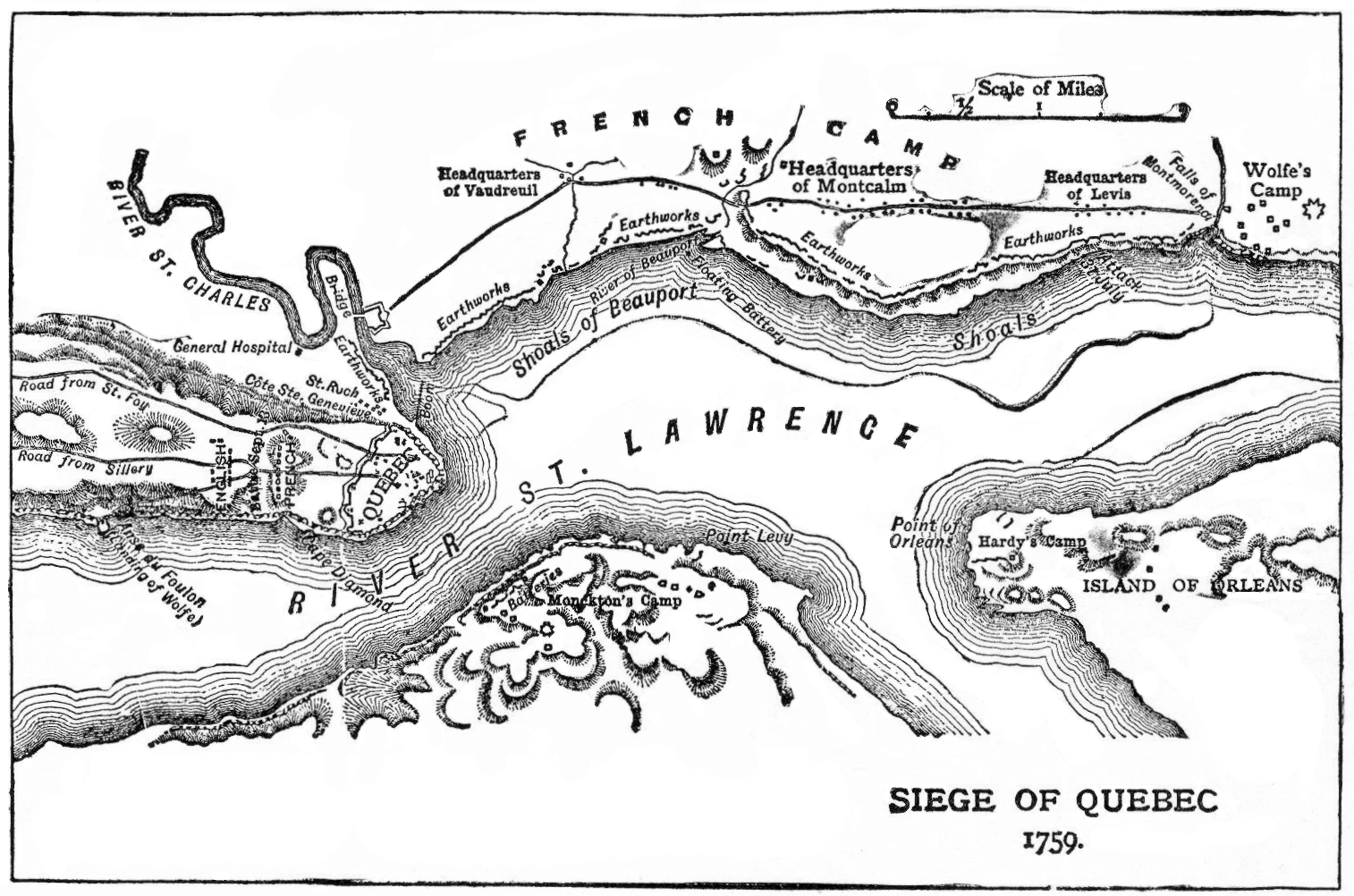
Map of Quebec with the distribution of French and British

Following the death of Braddock, William Shirley assumed command of British forces in North America, and he laid out his plans for 1756 at a meeting in Albany in December 1755. He proposed renewing the efforts to capture Niagara, Crown Point, and Duquesne, with attacks on Fort Frontenac on the north shore of Lake Ontario and an expedition through the wilderness of the Maine district and down the Chaudière River to attack the city of Quebec. His plan, however, got bogged down by disagreements and disputes with others, including William Johnson and New York's Governor Sir Charles Hardy, and consequently gained little support.

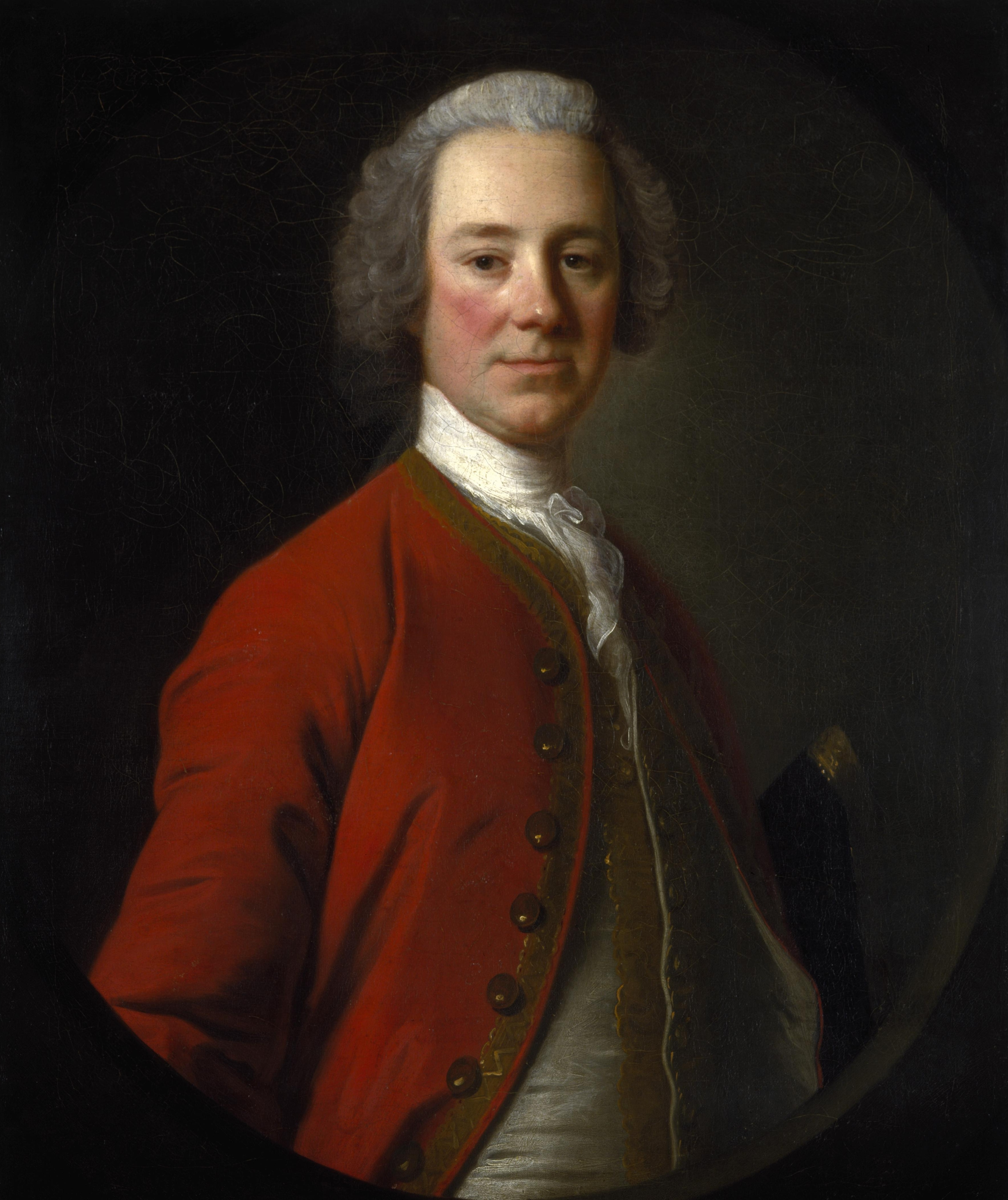
In January 1756, John Campbell was named as the new British Commander-in-Chief, North America.

Newcastle replaced him in January 1756 with Lord Loudoun, with Major General James Abercrombie as his second in command. Neither of these men had as much campaign experience as the trio of officers whom France sent to North America. French regular army reinforcements arrived in New France in May 1756, led by Major General Louis-Joseph de Montcalm and seconded by the Chevalier de Lévis and Colonel François-Charles de Bourlamaque, all experienced veterans from the War of the Austrian Succession. On May 17, 1756, Britain formally declared war on France, which expanded the war into Europe and came to be known as the Seven Years' War.

Governor Vaudreuil had ambitions to become the French commander in chief, in addition to his role as governor, and he acted during the winter of 1756 before those reinforcements arrived. Scouts had reported the weakness of the British supply chain, so he ordered an attack against the forts which Shirley had erected at the Oneida Carry. In the Battle of Fort Bull, French forces destroyed the fort and large quantities of supplies, including 45,000 pounds of gunpowder. They set back any British hopes for campaigns on Lake Ontario and endangered the Oswego garrison, already short on supplies. French forces in the Ohio valley also continued to intrigue with Indians throughout the area, encouraging them to raid frontier settlements. This led to ongoing alarms along the western frontiers, with streams of refugees returning east to get away from the action.

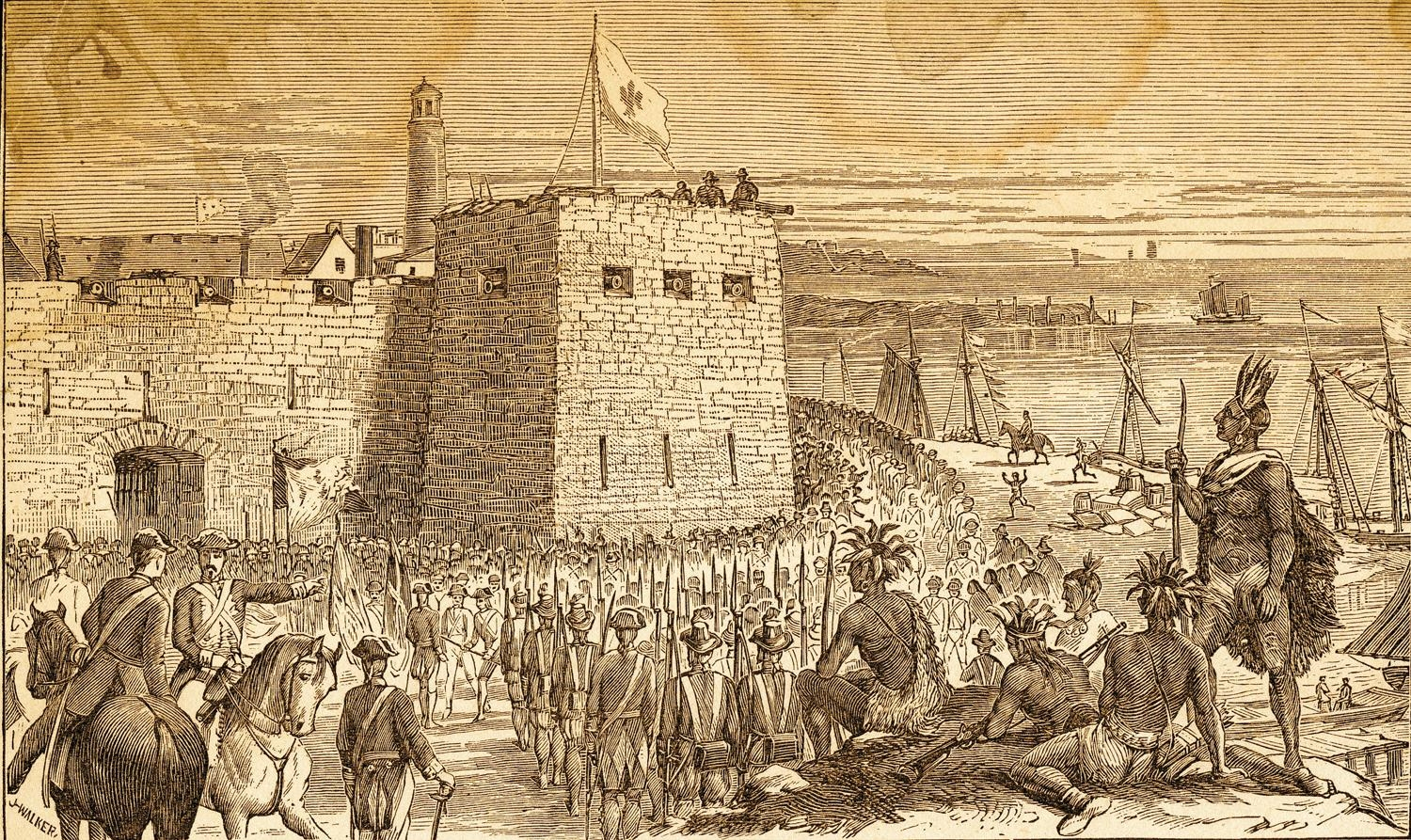
In August 1756, French soldiers and native warriors led by Louis-Joseph de Montcalm successfully attacked Fort Oswego.

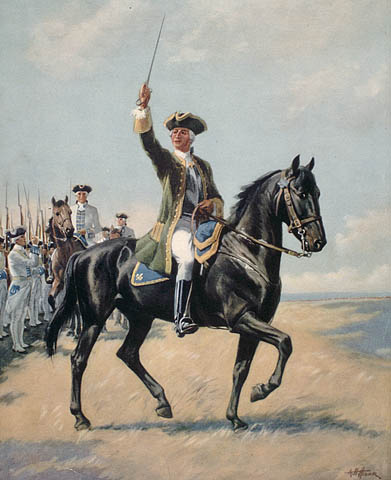
General Louis-Joseph de Montcalm

The new British command was not in place until July. Abercrombie arrived in Albany but refused to take any significant actions until Loudoun approved them, and Montcalm took bold action against his inertia. He built on Vaudreuil's work harassing the Oswego garrison and executed a strategic feint by moving his headquarters to Ticonderoga, as if to presage another attack along Lake George. With Abercrombie pinned down at Albany, Montcalm slipped away and led the successful attack on Oswego in August. In the aftermath, Montcalm and the Indians under his command disagreed about the disposition of prisoners' personal effects. The Europeans did not consider them prizes and prevented the Indians from stripping the prisoners of their valuables, which angered the Indians.

Loudoun was a capable administrator but a cautious field commander, and he planned one major operation for 1757: an attack on New France's capital of Quebec. He left a sizable force at Fort William Henry to distract Montcalm and began organizing for the expedition to Quebec. He was then ordered to attack Louisbourg first by William Pitt, the Secretary of State responsible for the colonies. The expedition was beset by delays of all kinds but was finally ready to sail from Halifax, Nova Scotia, in early August. In the meantime, French ships had escaped the British blockade of the French coast, and a fleet awaited Loudoun at Louisbourg which outnumbered the British fleet. Faced with this strength, Loudoun returned to New York amid news that a massacre had occurred at Fort William Henry.

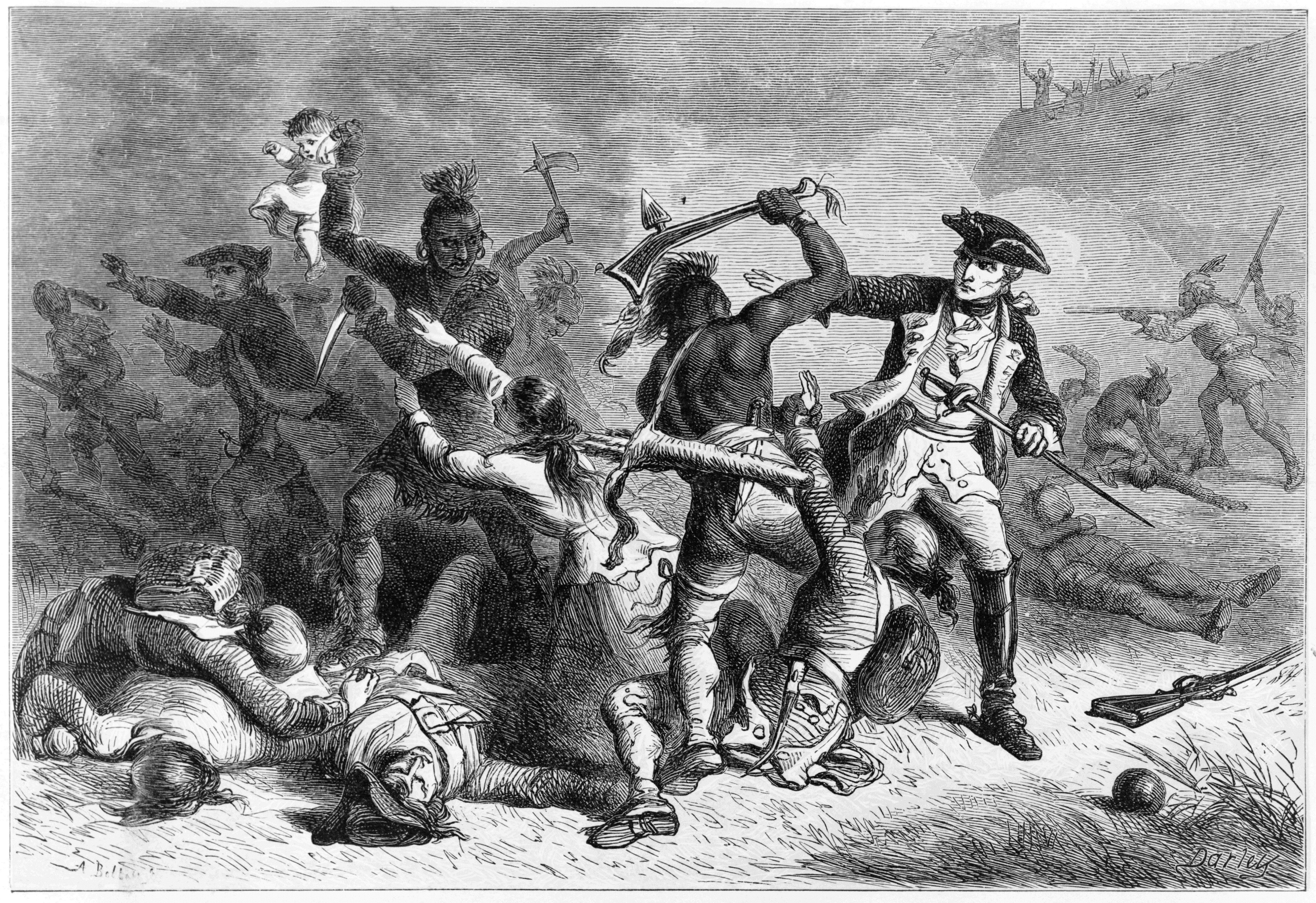
Montcalm attempts to stop native warriors from attacking the British. A number of British soldiers were killed after the Siege of Fort William Henry.

French irregular forces (Canadian scouts and Indians) harassed Fort William Henry throughout the first half of 1757. In January, they ambushed British rangers near Ticonderoga. In February, they launched a raid against the position across the frozen Lake George, destroying storehouses and buildings outside the main fortification. In early August, Montcalm and 7,000 troops besieged the fort, which capitulated with an agreement to withdraw under parole. When the withdrawal began, some of Montcalm's Indian allies attacked the British column because they were angry about the lost opportunity for loot, killing and capturing several hundred men, women, children, and slaves. The aftermath of the siege may have contributed to the transmission of smallpox into remote Indian populations, as some Indians were reported to have traveled from beyond the Mississippi to participate in the campaign and returned afterward. Modern writer William Nester believes that the Indians might have been exposed to European carriers, although no proof exists.

=== British conquest, 1758–1760 ===
Vaudreuil and Montcalm were minimally resupplied in 1758, as the British blockade of the French coastline limited French shipping. The situation in New France was further exacerbated by a poor harvest in 1757, a difficult winter, and the allegedly corrupt machinations of François Bigot, the intendant of the territory. His schemes to supply the colony inflated prices and were believed by Montcalm to line his pockets and those of his associates. A massive outbreak of smallpox among western Indian tribes led many of them to stay away from trading in 1758. The disease probably spread through the crowded conditions at William Henry after the battle; yet the Indians blamed the French for bringing "bad medicine" as well as denying them prizes at Fort William Henry.

Montcalm focused his meager resources on the defense of the St. Lawrence, with primary defenses at Carillon, Quebec, and Louisbourg, while Vaudreuil argued unsuccessfully for a continuation of the raiding tactics that had worked quite effectively in previous years. The British failures in North America combined with other failures in the European theater and led to Newcastle's fall from power along with the Duke of Cumberland, his principal military advisor.

British forces besieging the Fortress of Louisbourg. The French fortress fell in July 1758 after a 48-day siege.

Newcastle and Pitt joined in an uneasy coalition in which Pitt dominated the military planning. He embarked on a plan for the 1758 campaign that was largely developed by Loudoun. He had been replaced by Abercrombie as commander in chief after the failures of 1757. Pitt's plan called for three major offensive actions involving large numbers of regular troops supported by the provincial militias, aimed at capturing the heartlands of New France. Two of the expeditions were successful, with Fort Duquesne and Louisbourg falling to sizable British forces.

==== 1758 ====
The Forbes Expedition was a British campaign in September–October 1758, with 6,000 troops led by General John Forbes sent to drive out the French from the contested Ohio Country. The French withdrew from Fort Duquesne and left the British in control of the Ohio River Valley. The great French fortress at Louisbourg in Nova Scotia was captured after a siege.

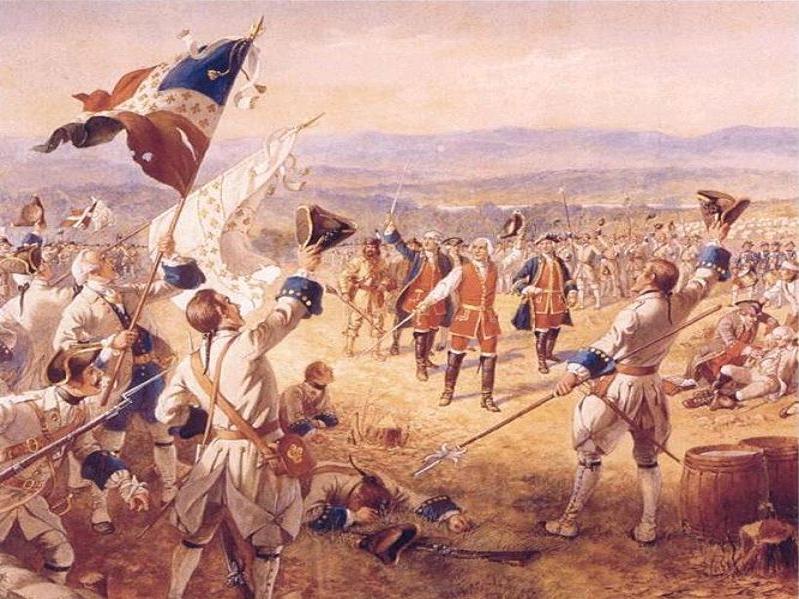
A British expedition sent to invade Canada was repulsed by the French at the Battle of Carillon in July 1758.

The third invasion was stopped with the improbable French victory in the Battle of Carillon, in which 3,600 Frenchmen defeated Abercrombie's force of 18,000 regulars, militia, and Indian allies outside the fort which the French called Carillon and the British called Ticonderoga. Abercrombie saved something from the disaster when he sent John Bradstreet on an expedition that successfully destroyed Fort Frontenac, including caches of supplies destined for New France's western forts and furs destined for Europe. Abercrombie was recalled and replaced by Jeffery Amherst, victor at Louisbourg.

The French had generally poor results in 1758 in most theaters of the war. The new foreign minister was the duc de Choiseul, and he decided to focus on an invasion of Britain to draw British resources away from North America and the European mainland. The invasion failed both militarily and politically, as Pitt again planned significant campaigns against New France and sent funds to Britain's mainland ally of Prussia, while the French Navy failed in the 1759 naval battles at Lagos and Quiberon Bay. In one piece of good fortune, some French supply ships did manage to depart France and elude the British blockade of the French coast.

==== 1759–1760 ====
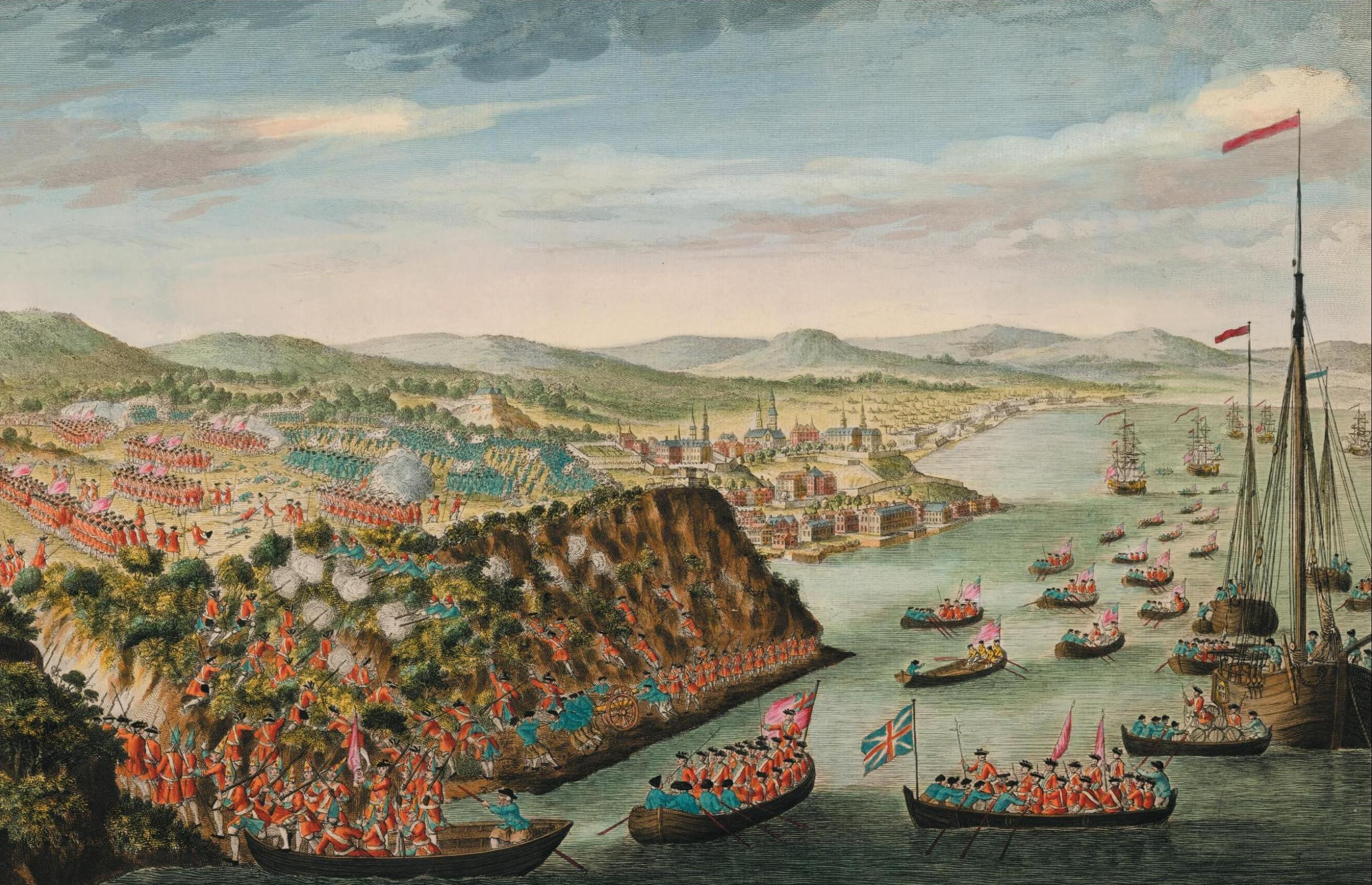
After a three-month siege of Quebec City, British forces captured the city at the Plains of Abraham.

The British proceeded to wage a campaign in the northwest frontier of Canada in an effort to cut off the French frontier forts to the west and south. They captured Ticonderoga and Fort Niagara, and they defeated the French at the Thousand Islands in the summer of 1759. In September 1759, James Wolfe defeated Montcalm in the Battle of the Plains of Abraham which claimed the lives of both commanders. After the battle, the French capitulated the city to the British.

In April 1760, François Gaston de Lévis led French forces to launch an attack to retake Quebec. Although he won the Battle of Sainte-Foy, Lévis' subsequent siege of Quebec ended in defeat when British ships arrived to relieve the garrison. After Lévis had retreated he was given another blow when a British naval victory at Restigouche brought the loss of French ships meant to resupply his army. In July Jeffrey Amherst then led British forces numbering around 18,000 men in a three pronged attack on Montreal. After eliminating French positions along the way all three forces met up and surrounded Montreal in September. Many Canadians deserted or surrendered their arms to British forces while the Native allies of the French sought peace and neutrality. De Lévis and the Marquis de Vaudreuil reluctantly signed the Articles of Capitulation of Montreal on September 8 which effectively completed the British conquest of New France.

=== Sporadic engagements, 1760–1763 ===
Most of the fighting ended in America in 1760, although it continued in Europe between France and Britain. The notable exception was the French seizure of St. John's, Newfoundland. General Amherst heard of this surprise action and immediately dispatched troops under his nephew William Amherst, who regained control of Newfoundland after the Battle of Signal Hill in September 1762. Many of the British troops who were stationed in America were reassigned to participate in further British actions in the West Indies, including the capture of Spanish Havana when Spain belatedly entered the conflict on the side of France, and a British expedition against French Martinique in 1762 led by Major General Robert Monckton.

== Peace ==
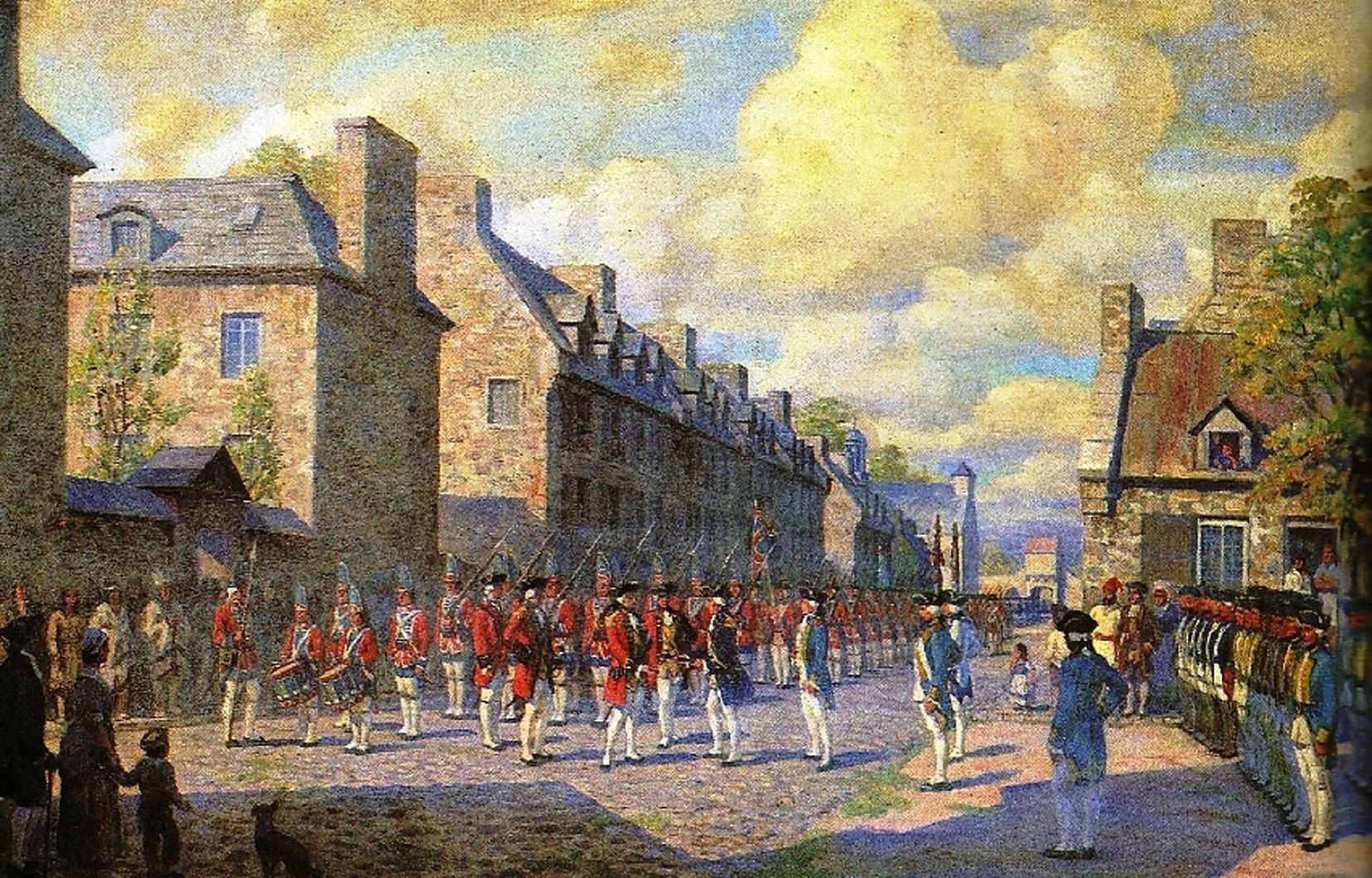
French authorities surrendering Montreal to British forces in 1760.

Governor Vaudreuil in Montreal negotiated a capitulation with General Amherst in September 1760. Amherst granted his requests that any French residents who chose to remain in the colony would be given freedom to continue worshiping in their Roman Catholic tradition, to own property, and to remain undisturbed in their homes. The British provided medical treatment for the sick and wounded French soldiers, and French regular troops were returned to France aboard British ships with an agreement that they were not to serve again in the present war.

General Amherst also oversaw the transfer of French fortifications to British control on the western frontier. The policies which he introduced in those lands disturbed large numbers of Natives and contributed to the outbreak of Pontiac's War in 1763, in which a series of Native attacks on frontier forts occurred, such as that on Fort Miami which effectively brought a nearly half-century long period of European garrisoning at Kekionga to an end. The frontier settlements required the continued deployment of British forces, and the conflict was not fully concluded until 1766.

Beginning from the 1750s and lasting until the 1760s, a smallpox outbreak devastated several Native communities throughout the American Midwest. The outbreak was brought on in part by victorious Native warriors who had fought on the side of the French bringing home prizes of war which had been infected with the disease; the Ojibwe, Odawa and Potawatomi peoples were most affected by the outbreak. An oral account from Odawa tribal leader and historian Andrew Blackbird claimed that the outbreak had "entirely depopulated and laid waste" to Waganagisi, a large Odawa settlement.

The war in North America, along with the global Seven Years' War, officially ended with the signing of the Treaty of Paris on 10 February 1763, by the kingdoms of Great Britain, France and Spain, with Portugal in agreement. The British offered France the choice of surrendering either its continental North American possessions east of the Mississippi or the Caribbean islands of Guadeloupe and Martinique, which had been occupied by the British. France chose to cede the former but was able to negotiate the retention of Saint Pierre and Miquelon, two small islands in the Gulf of St. Lawrence, along with fishing rights in the area. They viewed the economic value of the Caribbean islands' sugar cane to be greater and easier to defend than the furs from the continent. French philosopher Voltaire referred to Canada disparagingly as nothing more than a few acres of snow. The British, however, were happy to take New France, as defence of their North American colonies would no longer be an issue (though the absence of that threat caused many colonists to conclude they no longer needed British protection). Britain also had ample places from which to obtain sugar. Spain traded Florida to Britain in order to regain Cuba, but they also gained Louisiana from France, including New Orleans, in compensation for their losses. Great Britain and Spain also agreed that navigation on the Mississippi River was to be open to vessels of all nations.

== Consequences ==
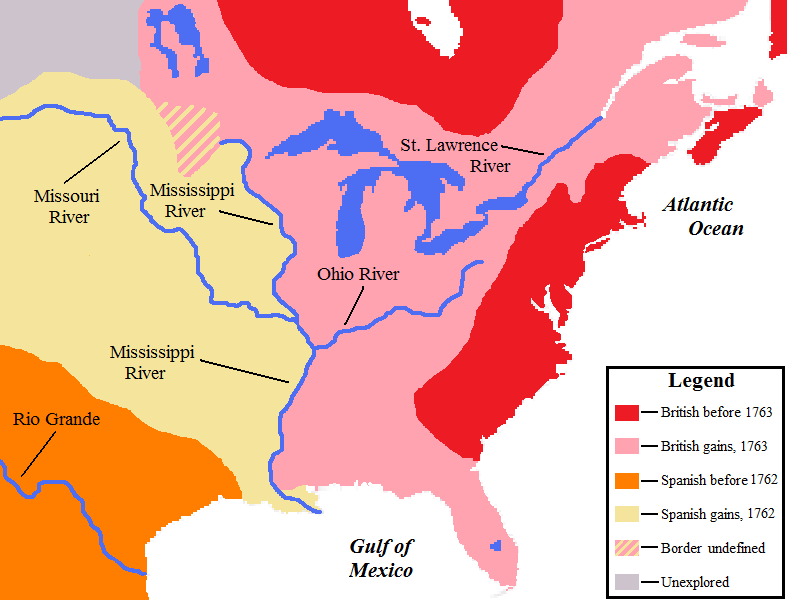
The resulting peace dramatically changed the political landscape of North America, with New France ceded to the British and the Spanish.

The war changed economic, political, governmental, and social relations among the three European powers, their colonies, and the people who inhabited those territories. France and Britain both suffered financially because of the war, with significant long-term consequences.

Britain gained control of French Canada and Acadia, colonies containing approximately 80,000 primarily French-speaking Roman Catholic residents. The deportation of Acadians beginning in 1755 made land available to immigrants from Europe and migrants from the colonies to the south. The British resettled many Acadians throughout its American provinces, but many went to France and some went to New Orleans, which they expected to remain French. Some were sent to colonize places as diverse as French Guiana and the Falkland Islands, but these efforts were unsuccessful. The Louisiana population contributed to founding the Cajun population. (The French word "Acadien" changed to "Cadien" then to "Cajun".)

King George III issued the Royal Proclamation of 1763 on October 7, 1763, which outlined the division and administration of the newly conquered territory, and it continues to govern relations to some extent between the government of Canada and the First Nations. Included in its provisions was the reservation of lands west of the Appalachian Mountains to its Indian population, a demarcation that was only a temporary impediment to a rising tide of westward-bound settlers. The proclamation also contained provisions that prevented civic participation by the Roman Catholic Canadians.

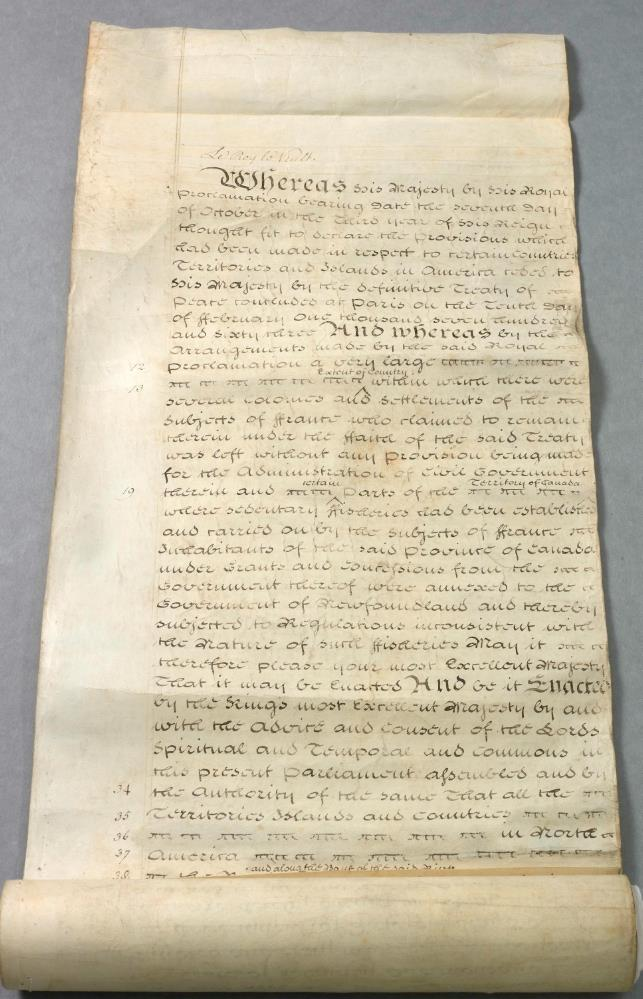
A copy of the Quebec Act passed in 1774 which addressed a number of grievances held by French Canadians and Indians, although it angered American colonists

The Quebec Act 1774 addressed issues brought forth by Roman Catholic French Canadians from the 1763 proclamation, and it transferred the Indian Reserve into the Province of Quebec. The Act maintained French Civil law, including the seigneurial system, a medieval code removed from France within a generation by the French Revolution. The Quebec Act was a major concern for the largely Protestant Thirteen Colonies over the advance of "popery". It is typically associated with other Intolerable Acts, legislation that eventually led to the American Revolutionary War. The Quebec Act served as the constitutional document for the province of Quebec until it was superseded by the Constitutional Act 1791.

The Seven Years' War nearly doubled Great Britain's national debt. The Crown sought sources of revenue to pay it off and attempted to impose new taxes on its colonies. These attempts were met with increasingly stiff resistance, until troops were called in to enforce the Crown's authority, and they ultimately contributed to the start of the American Revolution. France attached comparatively little value to its American possessions, apart from the highly profitable sugar-producing Antilles islands which it retained. Minister Choiseul considered that he had made a good deal at the Treaty of Paris, and Voltaire wrote that Louis XV had lost a few acres of snow. However, the military defeat and the financial burden of the war weakened the French monarchy and contributed to the advent of the French Revolution in 1789.

The elimination of French power in America meant the disappearance of a strong ally for some Indian tribes. The Ohio Country was now more available to colonial settlement due to the construction of military roads by Braddock and Forbes. The Spanish takeover of the Louisiana territory was not completed until 1769, and it had modest repercussions. The British takeover of Spanish Florida resulted in the westward migration of Indian tribes who did not want to do business with them. This migration also caused a rise in tensions between the Choctaw and the Creek, historic enemies who were competing for land. The change of control in Florida also prompted its Catholic population to leave. Most went to Cuba, although some Christianized Yamasee were resettled to the coast of Mexico.

France returned to America in 1778 with the establishment of a Franco-American alliance against Great Britain in the American Revolutionary War, in what historian Alfred A. Cave describes as French "revenge for Montcalm's death".

== Sources ==
- Anderson, Fred (2000). Crucible of War: The Seven Years' War and the Fate of Empire in British North America, 1754–1766. New York: Knopf. ISBN 978-0-375-40642-3.
- Anderson, Fred (2005). The War that Made America: A Short History of the French and Indian War. New York: Viking. ISBN 978-0-670-03454-3. – Released in conjunction with the 2006 PBS miniseries The War that Made America.
- Brumwell, Stephen (2006). Redcoats: The British Soldier and War in the Americas, 1755–1763. Cambridge University Press. ISBN 978-0-521-67538-3.
- Calloway, Colin G (2006). The Scratch of a Pen: 1763 and the Transformation of North America. Oxford University Press. ISBN 978-0-19-530071-0.
- Cave, Alfred A. (2004). The French and Indian War. Westport, Connecticut; London: Greenwood Press. ISBN 978-0-313-32168-9.
- Eckert, Allan W. Wilderness Empire. Bantam Books, 1994, originally published 1969. ISBN 0-553-26488-5. Second volume in a series of historical narratives, with emphasis on Sir William Johnson. Academic historians often regard Eckert's books, which are written in the style of novels, to be unreliable, as they contain things like dialogue that is clearly fictional.
- Ellis, Joseph J. (2004). His Excellency George Washington. New York: Vintage Books. ISBN 978-1-4000-3253-2.
- Fowler, William M. (2005). Empires at War: The French and Indian War and the Struggle for North America, 1754-1763. New York: Walker. ISBN 978-0-8027-1411-4.
- Gipson, Lawrence H. The Great War for the Empire: The Years of Defeat, 1754–1757 (1948); The Great War for the Empire: The Victorious Years, 1758–1760 (1950) highly detailed narrative of the British war in North America and Europe.
- Jacobs, Wilbur R. Diplomacy and Indian Gifts: Anglo-French Rivalry Along the Ohio and Northwest Frontiers, 1748–1763 (1949) excerpt
- Jennings, Francis (1988). Empire of Fortune: Crowns, Colonies, and Tribes in the Seven Years' War in America. New York: Norton. ISBN 978-0-393-30640-8.
- Murrin, John M. (1973). "The French and Indian War, the American Revolution, and the Counterfactual Hypothesis: Reflections on Lawrence Henry Gipson and John Shy". Reviews in American History. 1 (3): 307–318. doi:10.2307/2701135. JSTOR 2701135.
- Nester, William R (2000). The first global war: Britain, France, and the fate of North America, 1756–1775. Westport, CT: Praeger. ISBN 978-0-275-96771-0. OCLC 41468552.
- Nester, William R. The French and Indian War and the Conquest of New France (2015). excerpt
- O'Meara, Walter (1965). Guns at the Forks. Englewood Cliffs, NJ: Prentice Hall. ISBN 978-0-8229-5309-8.
- Parkman, Francis. Montcalm and Wolfe: The French and Indian War. Originally published 1884. New York: Da Capo, 1984. ISBN 0-306-81077-8
- Peyser (1996). Jacques Legardeur de Saint-Pierre: Officer, Gentleman, Entrepreneur. Michigan State University Press. ISBN 978-0870134180.
- Taylor, M. Brook (1994). Canadian History: a Reader's Guide: Volume 1: Beginnings to Confederation. University of Toronto Press. ISBN 978-0802068262.
- West, Doug (2016) French and Indian War – A Short History 30 Minute Book Series
