= Capitulation (surrender) =

Form of surrender

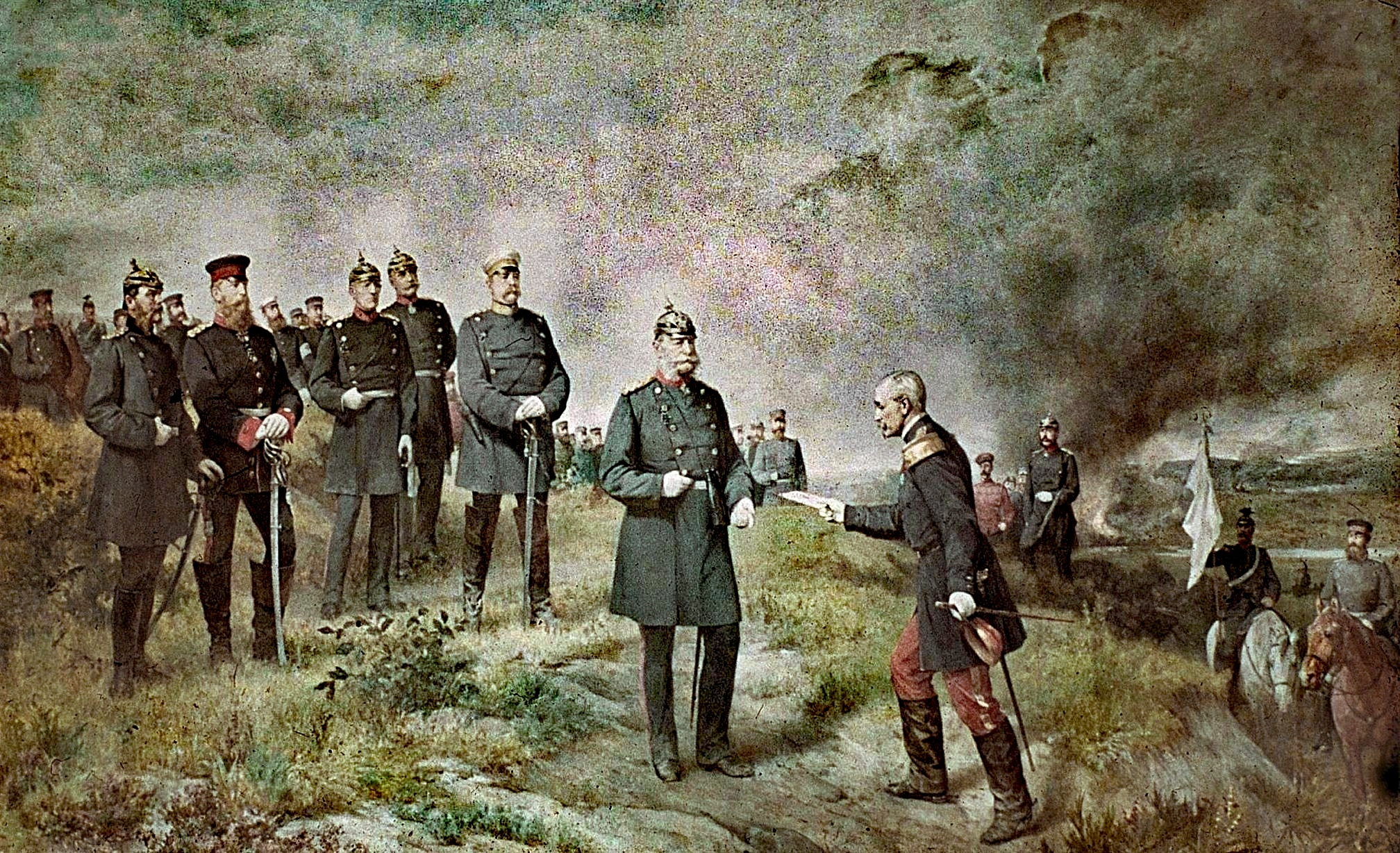
André Charles Victor Reille delivering Napoleon III's agreement to capitulate to Wilhelm I at the Battle of Sedan

Capitulation (Latin: capitulum, a little head or division; capitulare, to treat upon terms) is an agreement in time of war for the surrender to a hostile armed force of a particular body of troops, a town or a territory.

It is an ordinary incident of war, and therefore no previous instructions from the captors' government are required before finally settling the conditions of capitulation. The most usual of such conditions are freedom of religion and security of private property on one hand, and a promise not to bear arms within a certain period on the other.

Such agreements may be rashly concluded with an inferior officer, on whose authority the enemy are not, in the actual position of the war, entitled to place reliance. When an agreement is made by an officer who has not the proper authority or who has exceeded the limits of his authority, it is termed a "sponsion", and, to be binding, must be confirmed by express or tacit ratification.

Article 35 of the Hague Convention (1899) on the laws and the customs of war requires that capitulations agreed on between the contracting parties must be in accordance with the rules of military honor. When once settled, they must be observed by both the parties.

== See also ==
- Capitulation (treaty) – This article also covers Swiss "military capitulations", or more plainly, mercenary contracts.
- Articles of Capitulation of Quebec
- Articles of Capitulation of Montreal
- White flag
