= Alfred A. Cave =

American historian (1935–2019)

- Born: February 8, 1935; Albuquerque, New Mexico
- Died: September 8, 2019 (aged 84)
- Education: Linfield College, University of Florida
- Children: 4
- Scientific career
- Fields: History, ethnohistory
- Workplaces: University of Toledo
- Thesis: The Jacksonian Movement in American Historiography (1961)
- Doctoral advisor: Arthur W. Thompson

Alfred A. Cave (February 8, 1935 – September 8, 2019) was an American professor, historian, and author. He was a Professor Emeritus of History at the University of Toledo, specializing in the ethnohistory of Colonial America, Native Americans, and the Jacksonian era.

His writing primarily focuses on ethnic conflict and accommodation in Colonial America. He is best known for the history, The Pequot War, which The New England Quarterly referred to as the "definitive study" of the Pequot War of 1636–8. Cave was recognized as a "distinguished teacher" at the University of Utah. When he taught at the University of Toledo, he was honored with an Outstanding Research Award from the institution. In 2012, the Ohio Academy of History honored him with the Distinguished Historian Award. In 2015, he was selected to receive the Distinguished Alumnus Award from the University of Florida.

== Personal background ==
Alfred Alexander Cave was born on February 8, 1935, in Albuquerque, New Mexico. He attended Linfield College, graduating magna cum laude with a Bachelor's degree in 1957. He earned a Master's degree in 1959 and his Ph.D. in 1961, both from the University of Florida.

== Academic career ==
Cave taught at four universities: the City College of New York, the University of Utah, the University of Florida, and the University of Toledo. He served as the Director of the Honors College and Dean of the College of Humanities at the University of Utah.

From 1973 to 1990, he served as the Dean of the College of Arts and Sciences at the University of Toledo. Returning to full-time teaching and research, he served as professor of history at Toledo until 2007. He remained active in research and publishing until his death in 2019.[8]

== Honors and awards ==
- Distinguished Teaching Award, University of Utah – 1967
- 1990, Salford University awarded him with an honorary Doctorate of Letters.
- 1997, Outstanding Research Award, University of Toledo
- 2012, Distinguished Historian Award, Ohio Academy of History
- 2015, Distinguished Alumnus Award, University of Florida.

== Published works ==
=== Selected articles and case studies ===
- "Thomas More and the New World". Albion: A Quarterly Journal Concerned with British Studies. 23 (2). The North American Conference on British Studies: 209–229. Summer 1991. doi:10.2307/4050603. JSTOR 4050603.
- "Who Killed John Stone? A Note on the Origins of the Pequot War". William and Mary Quarterly. 49 (3). Omohundro Institute of Early American History and Culture: 509–521. July 1992. doi:10.2307/2947109. JSTOR 2947109.
- "Indian Shamans and English Witches in Seventeenth-Century New England". Essex Institute Historical Collections. 128: 239–254. October 1992.
- "The Failure of the Shawnee Prophet's Witch-Hunt". Ethnohistory. 42 (3). American Society for Ethnohistory: 445–475. Summer 1995. doi:10.2307/483214. JSTOR 483214.
- "Why Was the Sagadahoc Colony Abandoned? An Evaluation of Evidence". The New England Quarterly. 68 (4). The New England Quarterly, Inc.: 625–640 December 1995. doi:10.2307/365878. JSTOR 365878.
- "The Shawnee Prophet, Tecumseh, and Tippecanoe: A Case Study of Historical Myth-Making". Journal of the Early Republic. 22 (4). University of Pennsylvania Press: 637–673. Winter 2002. doi:10.2307/3124761. JSTOR 3124761.
- "Abuse of Power: Andrew Jackson and the Indian Removal Act of 1830". The Historian. 65 (6): 1330–1353. Winter 2003. doi:10.1111/j.0018-2370.2003.00055.x. ISSN 0018-2370. JSTOR 24452618. OCLC 9977977675.
- Stone, Dan, ed. (2008). "Genocide in the Americas" (PDF). The Historiography of Genocide. Palgrave Macmillan. pp. 273–295. ISBN 978-1-4039-9219-2. OCLC 1452401679.
- "The Origins of Genocide against Native Americans: Virginia in the Seventeenth Century". Global Dialogue. 15 (1). Centre for World Dialogue. Winter–Spring 2013. Archived from the original on 2013-12-07.

=== Books ===
- Jacksonian Democracy and the Historians. Gainesville: University of Florida Press. 1964. OCLC 1150113974 – via Internet Archive. Republished: ISBN 978-0-8130-0044-2
- Cave, Alfred A.; Clayton, James L. (1969). American Civilization: A Documentary History. Dubuque, Iowa: Kendall/Hunt Pub. Co. ISBN 978-0-8403-0001-0. OCLC 124012.
- An American Conservative in the Age of Jackson: The Political and Social Thought of Calvin Colton. Texas Christian University Press. OCLC 13870.
- The Pequot War. Amherst: University of Massachusetts Press. 1996. ISBN 978-1-55849-029-1. OCLC 43475458 – via Internet Archive.
- The French and Indian War. Westport, Conn: Greenwood Press. 2004. ISBN 978-0-313-32168-9. OCLC 57479223.
- Prophets of the Great Spirit: Native American Revitalization Movements in Eastern North America. Lincoln: University of Nebraska Press. 2006. ISBN 978-0-8032-1555-9. OCLC 65195440.
- Lethal encounters: Englishmen and Indians in colonial Virginia. Lincoln: University of Nebraska Press. 2013. doi:10.5040/9798400678479. ISBN 978-0-8032-4834-2. OCLC 703152921.
- The Fraudulent Verses: the Death of a Theocracy. 2014. ASIN B00J81OJ5E.
- Sharp Knife: Andrew Jackson and the American Indians. Santa Barbara, California: Praeger. 2017. doi:10.5040/9798216014324. ISBN 978-1-4408-6039-3. OCLC 987437631.
