= Mehr Alikhani =

Mehr Alikhani مهرعلي خاني
- Village
- Location within Iran
- Coordinates: 33°34′49″N 48°25′03″E
- Country: Iran
- Province: Lorestan
- County: Khorramabad
- Bakhsh: Central
- Rural District: Dehpir-e Shomali

Population (2006)
  - Total: 116
- Time zone: UTC+3:30 (IRST)
  - Summer (DST): UTC+4:30 (IRDT)

Mehr Alikhani (Persian: مهرعلي خاني, also Romanized as Mehr ‘Alīkhānī and Mīr ‘Alīkhānī; also known as Pīr ‘alī Khānī) is a village in Dehpir-e Shomali Rural District, in the Central District of Khorramabad County, Lorestan Province, Iran. At the 2006 census, its population was 116, in 22 families.
