= Centre for World Dialogue =

Cyprus-based think tank

The Centre for World Dialogue is an independent, privately funded think tank based in Nicosia, Cyprus.

The Centre was founded by Hossein Alikhani and his wife Jila Faramarzi in 1996. Its conception is based on the premise that global dialogue can bring individuals from diverse viewpoints face to face with one another in the hopes of reaching vital consensus on issues of global concern. The Centre further believes that conflicts can be prevented more effectively through engagement and dialogue than through sanctions, containment, or the threat of force. The Centre initiates and encourages dialogue on political, social, economic, and religious issues of global and regional concern, between individuals and organisations.

The Centre for World Dialogue is a non-aligned, non-profit organisation, with no affiliation to any government or political body. Funding for programmes comes from individual and private contributions. Based in Cyprus, the Centre enjoys the advantages of the island's unique position as a bridge between East and West. The Centre also has representative offices in Tbilisi, Paris, London, Geneva and Washington D.C.

The Centre counts diverse individuals as members of its Board of Governors: Princess Wijdan Ali of Jordan, Sir Cyril Townsend, Gary Sick, John D. Marks, Ambassador Richard W. Murphy and John Esposito.

== Events ==
The Centre has organised numerous events to facilitate discussion between individuals, academics, theologians, diplomats and world leaders. Some of the topics of these conferences and events have been Political Islam and the West, Iran in the Twenty First Century, Children's Rights and Wrongs and The Future of Iraq.

A historic meeting between one of the former hostage-takers of the US Embassy in Tehran and his former hostage was initiated and organized by the Centre in 1998. The landmark meeting between Abbas Abdi and Barry Rosen took place at the UNESCO headquarters in Paris and was described by Time magazine as "a powerful reconciliation".

== Global Dialogue ==
The Centre publishes a quarterly journal on issues of global concern. The journal is called Global Dialogue.
