= Ghodratollah Alikhani =

Iranian cleric

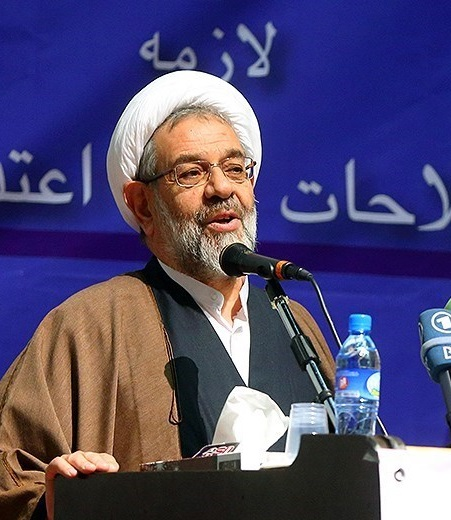

Member of the Parliament of Iran
- In office 28 May 2008 – 28 May 2012
- Constituency: Qazvin and Abyek
- In office 28 May 2000 – 28 May 2008
- Constituency: Buin Zahra and Avaj
- Majority: 37,509 (52.7%); 47,642 (59.28%)

Personal details
- Born: c. 1939 (age 86–87) Takestan County, Qazvin Province, Iran
- Party: Association of Combatant Clerics
- Children: Mohammad Alikhani

Ghodratollah Alikhani (Persian: قدرت‌الله علیخانی) is an Iranian Shi'a cleric and reformist politician who formerly represented Qazvin Province constituencies in the Parliament of Iran.
