= Aha Khani =

Aha Khani اهاخاني
- Village
- Location within Iran
- Coordinates: 26°58′27″N 57°06′06″E
- Country: Iran
- Province: Hormozgan
- County: Minab
- Bakhsh: Central
- Rural District: Karian

Population (2006)
  - Total: 255
- Time zone: UTC+3:30 (IRST)
  - Summer (DST): UTC+4:30 (IRDT)

Aha Khani (Persian: اهاخاني, also Romanized as Āhā Khānī; also known as Āhūgānī (Persian: اهوگاني), ‘Alīkhānī, and ‘Alī Khānī) is a village in Karian Rural District, in the Central District of Minab County, Hormozgan Province, Iran. At the 2006 census, its population was 255, in 50 families.
