= Kidnapping of Hossein Alikhani =

Abduction of Iranian businessman and author

Hossein Alikhani
- Born: Iran
- Died: 4 March 2008
- Occupations: NGO founder; Political scientist; Author
- Known for: Authoring books on U.S. sanctions against Libya and Iran; Founding the Centre for World Dialogue; Advocacy for US-Iran relations; Being abducted by U.S. Customs Service agents in 1992
- Notable work: In the Claw of The Eagle: A Guide to U.S Sanctions Against Libya; Sanctioning Iran: Anatomy of a Failed Policy

Hossein Alikhani was an Iranian non-governmental organization founder, political scientist, and author who was abducted in a sting operation by undercover United States Customs Service agents in 1992, and released after being held for 130 days.

== Life and career ==
Alikhani was the author of In the Claw of The Eagle: A Guide to U.S Sanctions Against Libya and Sanctioning Iran: Anatomy of a Failed Policy, and was an authority on the subject of unilateral trade sanctions and the Iran and Libya Sanctions Act of 1996. He founded the NGO Centre for World Dialogue based in Nicosia, Cyprus. Despite his own troubles in the United States, Alikhani was an avid proponent of improving US-Iran relations and enabled the first meeting between the former Iranian hostage-taker of the United States embassy in Tehran, Abbas Abdi and his former hostage, Barry Rosen. The reconciliation meeting in 1998 was organized by the Centre for World Dialogue and took place at the UNESCO headquarters in Paris.

Hossein Alikhani died on 4 March 2008 at the age of 63 after battling acute leukemia. His children include the Emmy Award-winning producer Borna Alikhani.

== Kidnapping ==
Alikhani was seized in the Bahamas in 1992, accused of violating American sanctions against Libya, and held for 130 days. His seizure was a "kidnapping" because the sanctions did not apply to non-American citizens living outside the United States.

Alikhani filed a suit in Iran against the United States for "kidnapping" him and, won the first lawsuit by an Iranian against the United States for supporting terrorism. Iran informed the U.S. government through the Swiss consulate in Tehran. According to the court decision the US government was required to pay $550 million to Alikhani.

As the United States refused to pay the money, Alikhani asked the court to put the American embassy in Tehran on sale. Alikhani expected to make as much as $200 million from the sale, much less than the $550 million awarded him by the Tehran court. This was a symbolic victory for Alikhani considering that the sale has not taken place; the US embassy compound is still housed by Iran's Revolutionary Guards.

Gary Sick, an Iran expert at Columbia University, says the U.S. made a mistake by allowing Americans to collect such large damages in these uncontested cases. "If we could play that game, others can play that game too," says Mr. Sick, who served at the National Security Council under three presidents.

Independent human rights bodies in the US also took up Alikhani's case much after the case was decided, presenting the case as one of extraordinary rendition.

== See also ==
- Iran hostage crisis
- State-sponsored terrorism
