= Articles of Capitulation of Montreal =

1760 surrender of Montreal to the British during the French and Indian War

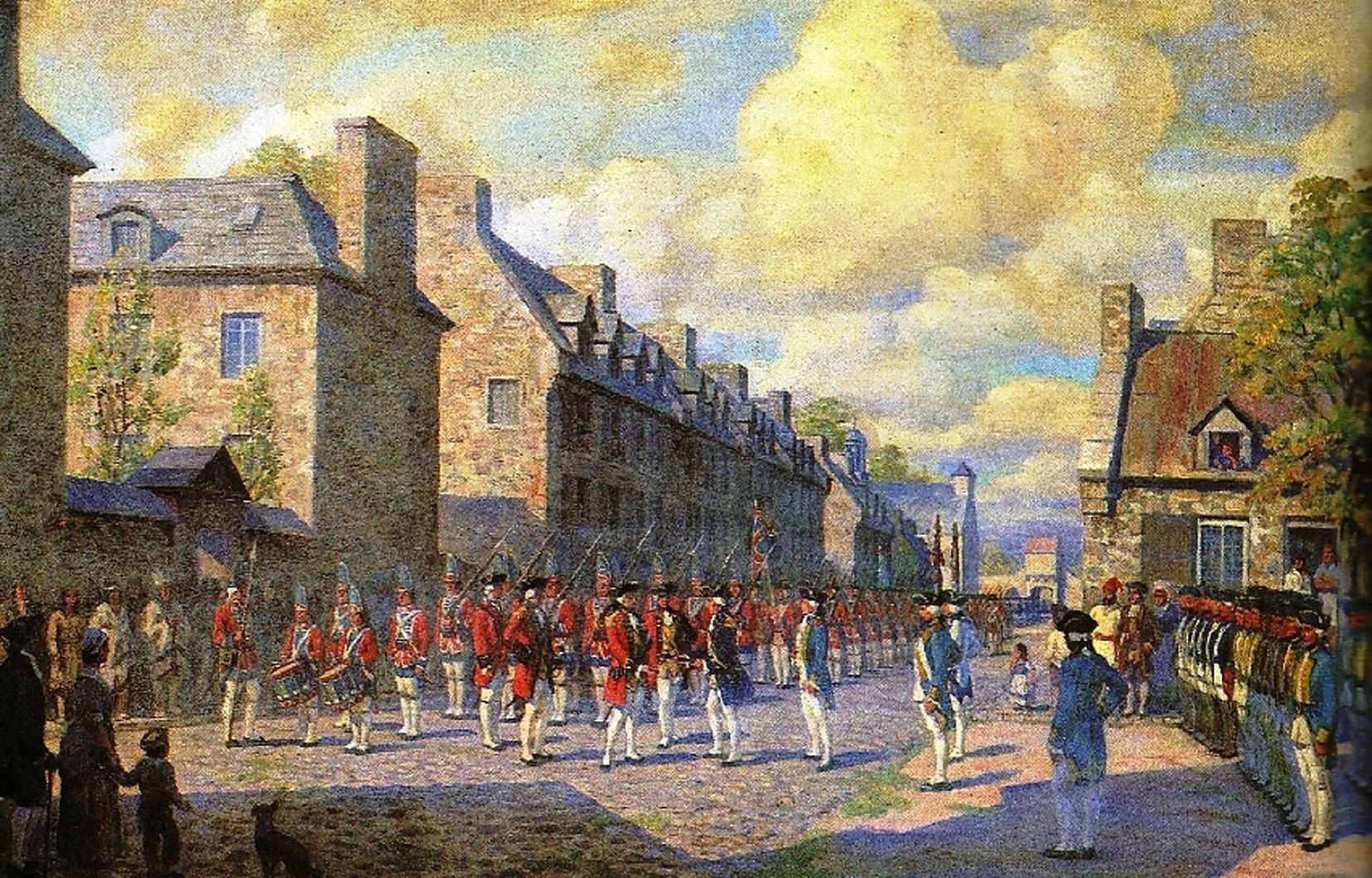
French authorities surrendering the city of Montreal to the British in 1760.

The Articles of Capitulation of Montreal (French: Articles de capitulation de Montréal) were agreed upon between the Governor General of New France, Pierre François de Rigaud, Marquis de Vaudreuil-Cavagnal, and Major-General Jeffery Amherst on behalf of the French and British crowns. They were signed on 8 September 1760 in the British camp before the city of Montreal, during the French and Indian War after a two-month campaign which led to the fall of the city.

There were 55 articles, including a large array of demands with regard to the protection of the inhabitants of New France: the French, the Canadians, the Acadians, and the First Nations. De Vaudreuil demanded that all be granted the rights and privileges of the other British subjects. These consisted an amnesty of Canadian militiamen who had fought for the French, the free exercise of the Roman Catholic faith, the continuation of the ownership of black and Indian slaves by French Canadians, the continuation of the rights and privileges of the clergy and seigneurs and the guarantee of the rights enjoyed by the native peoples under the French regime. Most were granted by the British Army except those with reference to the Acadians.

Although the articles were drafted without participation from First Nations, Article 40 of the treaty recognized their sovereignty and autonomy, promising to uphold their right to their lands and religion and avoid punishment for having fought for the French.

== See also ==
- Articles of Capitulation of Quebec
- Timeline of Quebec history
