= Alikhani, Iran =

Alikhani علي خاني
- Village
- Location within Iran
- Coordinates: 34°58′30″N 46°00′14″E
- Country: Iran
- Province: Kermanshah
- County: Salas-e Babajani
- Bakhsh: Central
- Rural District: Khaneh Shur

Population (2006)
  - Total: 162
- Time zone: UTC+3:30 (IRST)
  - Summer (DST): UTC+4:30 (IRDT)

Alikhani (Persian: علي خاني, also Romanized as ‘Alīkhānī) is a village in Khaneh Shur Rural District, in the Central District of Salas-e Babajani County, Kermanshah Province, Iran. At the 2006 census, its population was 162, in 32 families.
