= Mohammad Alikhani (politician) =

Iranian reformist politician

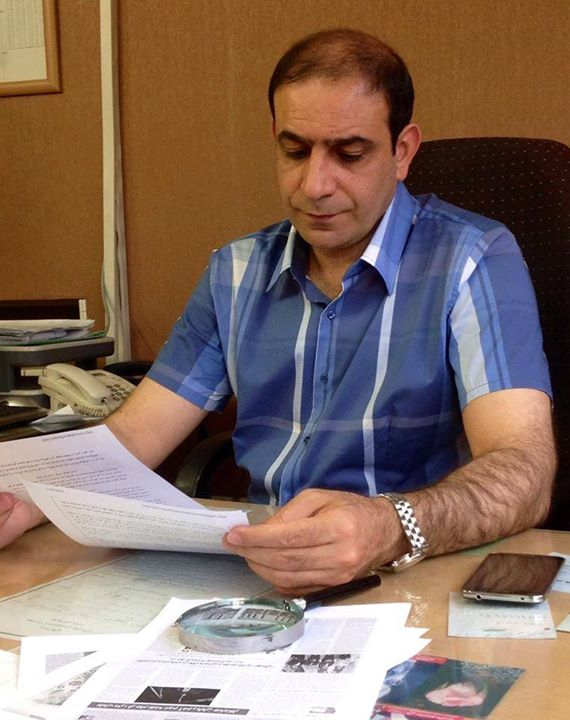

Member of City Council of Tehran
- In office 23 August 2017 – 4 August 2021

Member of Parliament of Iran
- In office 14 August 2005 – 28 May 2008
- Constituency: Qazvin and Abyek

Personal details
- Party: Islamic Iran Youth Party
- Parent: Ghodratollah Alikhani (father)
- Website: mohammadalikhani.com

Mohammad Alikhani (Persian: محمد علیخانی) is an Iranian reformist politician who currently serves as a member of the City Council of Tehran. Alikhani formerly represented Qazvin in the parliament.

He published a weekly named Taban and wrote a weblog.
