= Articles of Capitulation of Quebec =

1759 surrender of Quebec City to the British during the French and Indian War

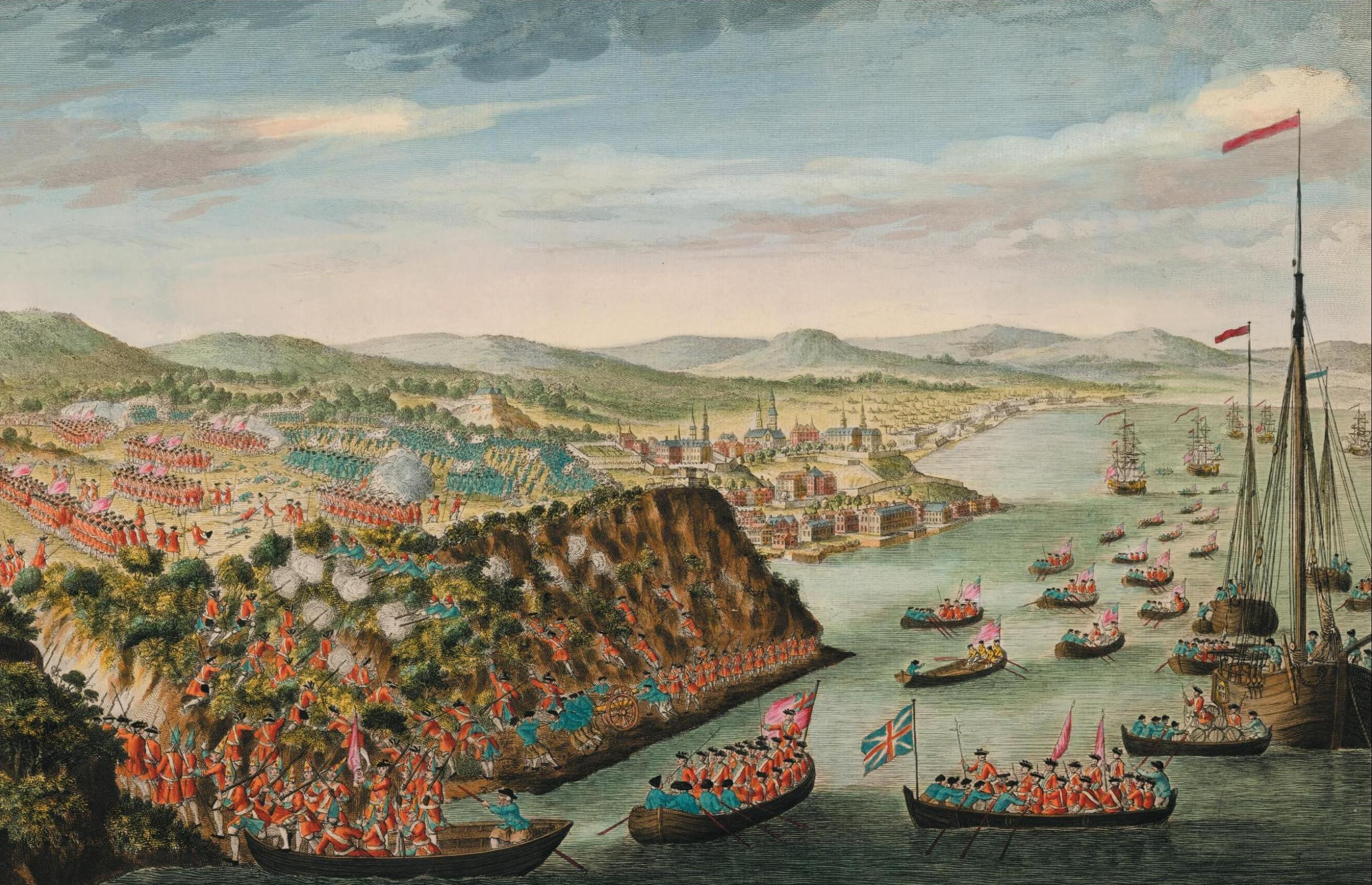
The Articles of Capitulation was signed several days after the British victory, at the Plains of Abraham.

The Articles of Capitulation of Quebec were agreed upon between Jean-Baptiste Nicolas Roch de Ramezay, King's Lieutenant, Admiral Sir Charles Saunders, and General George Townshend on behalf of the French and British crowns during the Seven Years' War. They were signed on 18 September 1759, shortly after British victory in the Battle of the Plains of Abraham.

All 11 demands of De Ramsay were granted by the British Army: the honors of war, the protection of the civilians and their properties, the free exercise of the Roman Catholic religion, etc. Several months later, on 28 April 1760, the French Royal Army attempted to retake Quebec City, at the Battle of Sainte-Foy. Although victorious in battle, the French were unable to retake the city due to a lack of naval support. General Chevalier de Lévis lifted the siege after the French Navy was defeated at the Battle of Neuville.

Nearly a year after the Articles of Capitulation for Quebec was signed, the government of New France capitulated in Montreal on 8 September 1760 after a two-month British campaign.

== Text ==
Articles of Capitulation Demanded by Mr. de RAMSAY [sic], the King's Lieutenant, commanding the high and low Towns of Quebec, chief of the military order of St. Lewis, to His Excellency the General of the troops of His Britannic Majesty—"The capitulation demanded on the part of the enemy, and granted by the Excellencies Admiral SAUNDERS and General Townshend, etc., etc., etc., is in manner and form hereafter expressed."
Number	Nature of demand	British response
1.	Mr. de Ramsay demands the honours of war for his Garrison, and that it shall be sent back to the army in safety, and by the shortest route, with arms, bagage, six pieces of brass cannon, two mortars or howitzers, and twelve rounds for each of them.	"The Garrison of the town, composed of land forces, marines and sailors, shall march out with their arms and bagage, drums beating, matches lighted, with two pieces of french cannon, and twelve rounds for each piece; and shall be embarked as conveniently as possible, to be sent to the first port in France."
2.	THAT the inhabitants shall be preserved in the possession of their houses, goods, effects and privileges.	"Granted, upon their laying down of their arms."
3.	THAT the inhabitants shall not be accountable for having carried arms for the defence of the town, for as much as they were compelled to it, and that the inhabitants of the colonies, of both crowns, equally serve as militia.	"Granted."
4.	THAT the effects of the absent officers and citizens shall not be touched.	"Granted."
5.	THAT the inhabitants shall not be removed, nor obliged to quit their houses, until their condition shall be settled by their Britannic, and Most Christian Majesties.	"Granted."
6.	THAT the exercise of the Catholic, Apostolic and Roman religion shall be maintained; and that safe guards shall be granted to the homes of the clergy, and to the monasteries, particularly to his Lordship the Bishop of Quebec, who, animated with zeal for religion, and charity for the people of his diocese, desires to reside in it constantly, to exercise, freely and with that decency which his character and the sacred offices of the Roman religion require, his episcopal authority in the town of Quebec, whenever he shall think proper, until the possession of Canada shall be decided by treaty between their most Christian and Britannic Majesties.	"The free exercise of the roman religion is granted, likewise safe guards to all religious persons, as well as to the Bishop, who shall be at liberty to come and express, freely and with decency, the functions of his office, whenever he shall think proper, until the possession of Canada shall have been decided between their Britannic and most Christian Majesties."
7.	THAT the artillery and warlike stores shall be faithfully given up, and that an inventory of them shall be made out.	"Granted."
8.	THAT the sick and wounded, commissaries, Chaplains, Physicians, Surgeons, Apothecaries, and other persons employed in the service of the hospitals, shall be treated conformably to the cartel of the 6th of February, 1759, settled between their most Christian and Britannic Majesties.	"Granted."
9.	THAT before delivering up the gate and the entrance of the town to the English troops, their General will be please to send some soldiers to be posted as safe guards upon the churches, convents, and principal habitations.	"Granted."
10.	THAT the King's Lieutenant, commanding in Quebec, shall be permitted to send information to the marquis de Vaudreuil, Governor General, of the reduction of the place, as also that the General may send advice thereof to the French Ministry.	"Granted."
11.	THAT the present capitulation shall be executed according to its form and tenour, without being subject, to non-execution under pretence of reprisals, or for the non-execution of any preceding capitulations.	"Granted"
12.	Allow de Vaudreuil and other senior French government officials to return to France.	"Granted, but they must leave official government documents behind"
13.	If the peace treaty to end the war returns Québec to France, de Vaudreuil must be allowed to return and the surrender is void.	"Whatever the British King decides will be done"
Duplicates hereof taken and executed by, and between us, at the camp before Quebec, this 18th Day of September, 1759.		CHARLES SAUNDERS; GEORGE TOWNSHEND; DE RAMSAY

== See also ==
- Articles of Capitulation of Montreal
- History of Quebec City
