= Adelphi University =

Private university in Garden City, New York, US

- Former name: Adelphi College (1896–1963)
- Motto: Vita Sine Litteris Mors Est (from Epistulae morales ad Lucilium by Seneca the Younger)
- Motto in English: Literal translation: "Life without learning is death" "The Truth Shall Make Us Free"
- Type: Private university
- Established: June 24, 1896; 130 years ago
- Endowment: $256 million (2024)
- President: Michael Balboni (effective June 1, 2026)
- Faculty: 1,309 (328 full-time, 981 part-time)
- Students: 7,406
- Location: Garden City, New York, United States; 40.720°N 73.652°W
- Campus: Suburban, 75 acres (300,000 m^{2})
- Colors: Brown & gold
- Nickname: Panthers
- Sporting affiliations: NCAA Division II – NE-10
- Mascot: Panther
- Website: adelphi.edu

Adelphi University is a private university in Garden City, New York, United States. Adelphi also has centers in Downtown Brooklyn, Hudson Valley, and Suffolk County in addition to a virtual, online campus for remote students. As of 2026, it had about 7,386 undergraduate and graduate students. The college's origins date to 1863 with the foundation of the Adelphi Academy, and Adelphi College itself was founded in 1893. From 1912 to 1946 the college was a women's college.

== History ==
=== Adelphi College ===
Adelphi University began with the Adelphi Academy, founded in Brooklyn, New York, in 1863. The academy was a private preparatory school located at 412 Adelphi Street, in the Fort Greene neighborhood of Brooklyn, but later moved to Clinton Hill. It was formally chartered in 1869 by the board of trustees of the City of Brooklyn for establishing "a first class institution for the broadest and most thorough training, and to make its advantages as accessible as possible to the largest numbers of our population." One of the teachers at the Adelphi Academy was Harlan Fiske Stone, who later served as the Chief Justice of the United States.

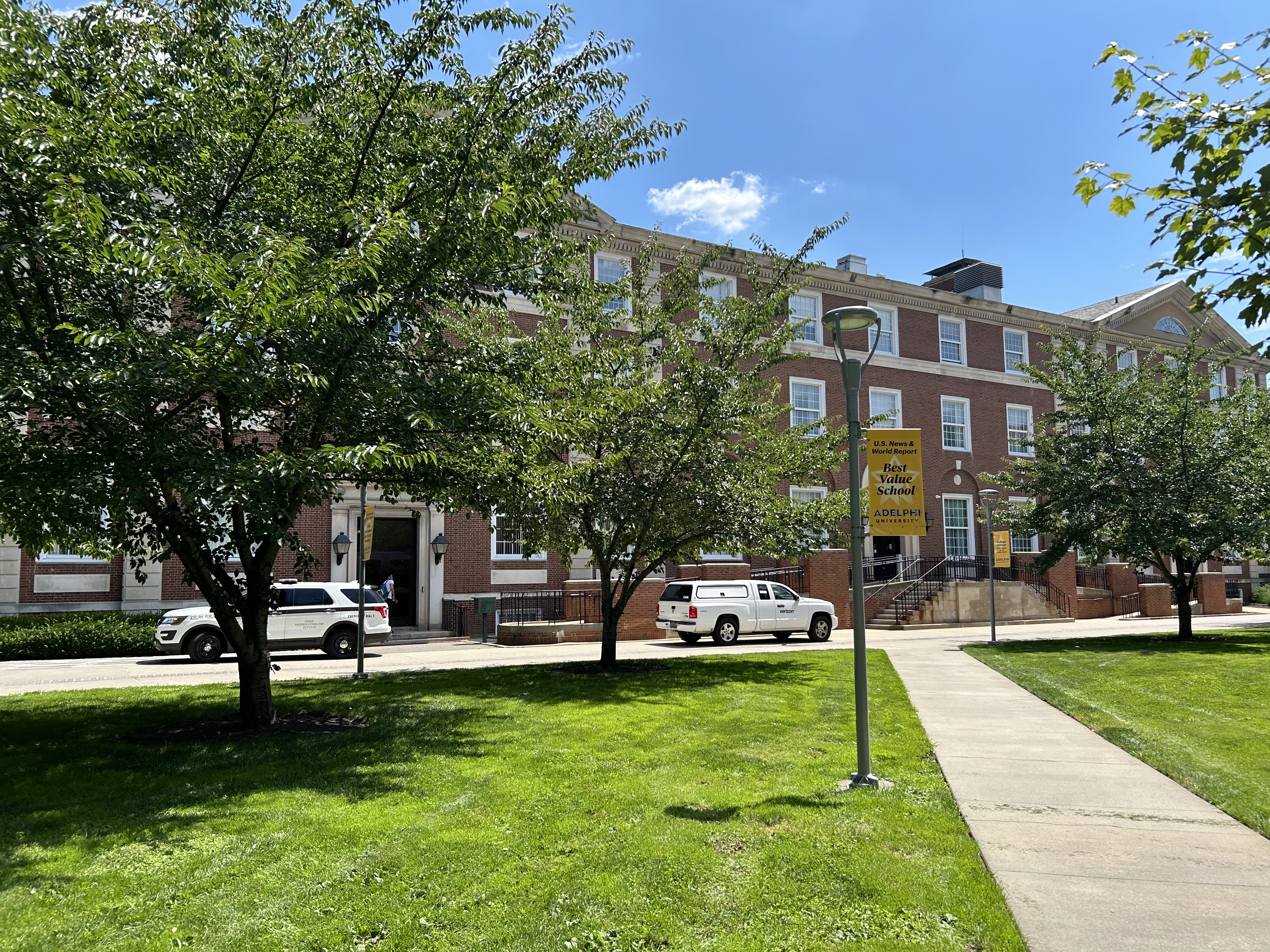
Levermore Hall - Administration Building

In 1893, Charles Herbert Levermore was appointed as the head of Adelphi Academy. Seeking to establish a liberal arts college for the City of Brooklyn, Levermore received a charter from the Board of Regents of the State of New York, officially establishing Adelphi College on June 24, 1896. The college received its charter through the efforts of Timothy Woodruff, former Lieutenant Governor of New York and future first president of the board of trustees. Adelphi was one of the first coeducational institutions to receive a charter from the State of New York. At the time of its foundation, the college numbered 57 students and 16 instructors. The Adelphi Academy continued to exist as a separate but nonetheless connected entity to the college. The new college was located in a building behind the Adelphi Academy, on the corner of St. James's Place and Clifton Place, in Brooklyn. The building that originally housed Adelphi is now used by Pratt Institute for their School of Architecture.

In 1912, Adelphi became a women's college. In 1922, the school raised over one million dollars to expand the overcrowded facilities in Brooklyn. In 1925, Adelphi College severed its ties with the Adelphi Academy, the latter closing in 1930. In 1929, the college moved from its founding location in Brooklyn to the current location of its main campus in Garden City, New York. The original "academy" continues to function as a P–12 school in Brooklyn. The original three buildings of the Garden City campus, Levermore Hall, Blodgett Hall and Woodruff Hall, were designed by McKim, Mead and White.

In 1938, the Dance Program was founded by Ruth St. Denis. In 1943, the School of Nursing was established. First Lady Eleanor Roosevelt presided over the opening of two federally funded residence halls on campus, in a speech entitled "The Challenge of Nursing for Young Women Today."

In 1946, after World War II ended, Adelphi reverted to a coeducational college.

=== Adelphi University ===
In 1963, the New York State Board of Regents granted the college university status, and the name was changed to Adelphi University. In 1964, the School of Business was founded. In 1966, the Institute for Advanced Psychological Studies was founded. In 1973, the university established ABLE (Adult Baccalaureate Learning Experience) for the education of adults. In 1995, the Honors College was founded.

In January 1963, Adelphi Suffolk College (which had started out in 1955 offering extension courses in Suffolk County, New York) purchased the former W.K. Vanderbilt estate in Oakdale, New York. In 1968, it was spun off to Dowling College after its chief benefactor, Robert Dowling.

Adelphi faced a serious scandal in 1996, as the school celebrated its 100th anniversary. University president Peter Diamandopoulos and the board of trustees were accused of neglect of duty, misconduct, and failure to carry out the educational purposes of Adelphi. The New York State Board of Regents was called in to investigate; Diamandopoulos, along with all but one of the board of trustees, was dismissed from office.

Adelphi University also participates in the National Association of Independent Colleges and Universities's (NAICU) University and College Accountability Network (U-CAN).

=== 2020s ===
In 2023, the Princeton Review ranked Adelphi University a "Green College" making the list of environmentally responsible colleges and universities across the country. Adelphi is frequently listed amongst the U.S.' most liberal colleges.

In August 2023, Adelphi relocated the Manhattan Center location to Downtown Brooklyn at 179 Livingston Street. Adelphi - Brooklyn Center, located on the 5th through 7th floors, is adjacent to Macy's Brooklyn store and shared with St. Francis College.

In early 2026, Adelphi announced a new Manhattan Center at 529 Fifth Avenue in Midtown, a 51,000‑square‑foot facility housing graduate and professional programs in nursing, business, artificial intelligence, social work, and education. Concurrently, the university launched a $55 million campus‑modernization project on its Garden City campus, funded in part by $125 million in tax‑exempt bonds.

In February 2026, a federal judge ruled that the university had erroneously found a student, Orion Newby, guilty of using artificial intelligence to write a paper, and ordered the plagiarism finding expunged. The case was described by legal observers as "groundbreaking" for student due‑process rights in the age of AI‑detection software.

During its 2026 Giving Day, the "1,896 Minutes to Give" campaign, Adelphi raised a record $2.25 million in support of students, with every sitting trustee participating.

== Breast cancer support program ==
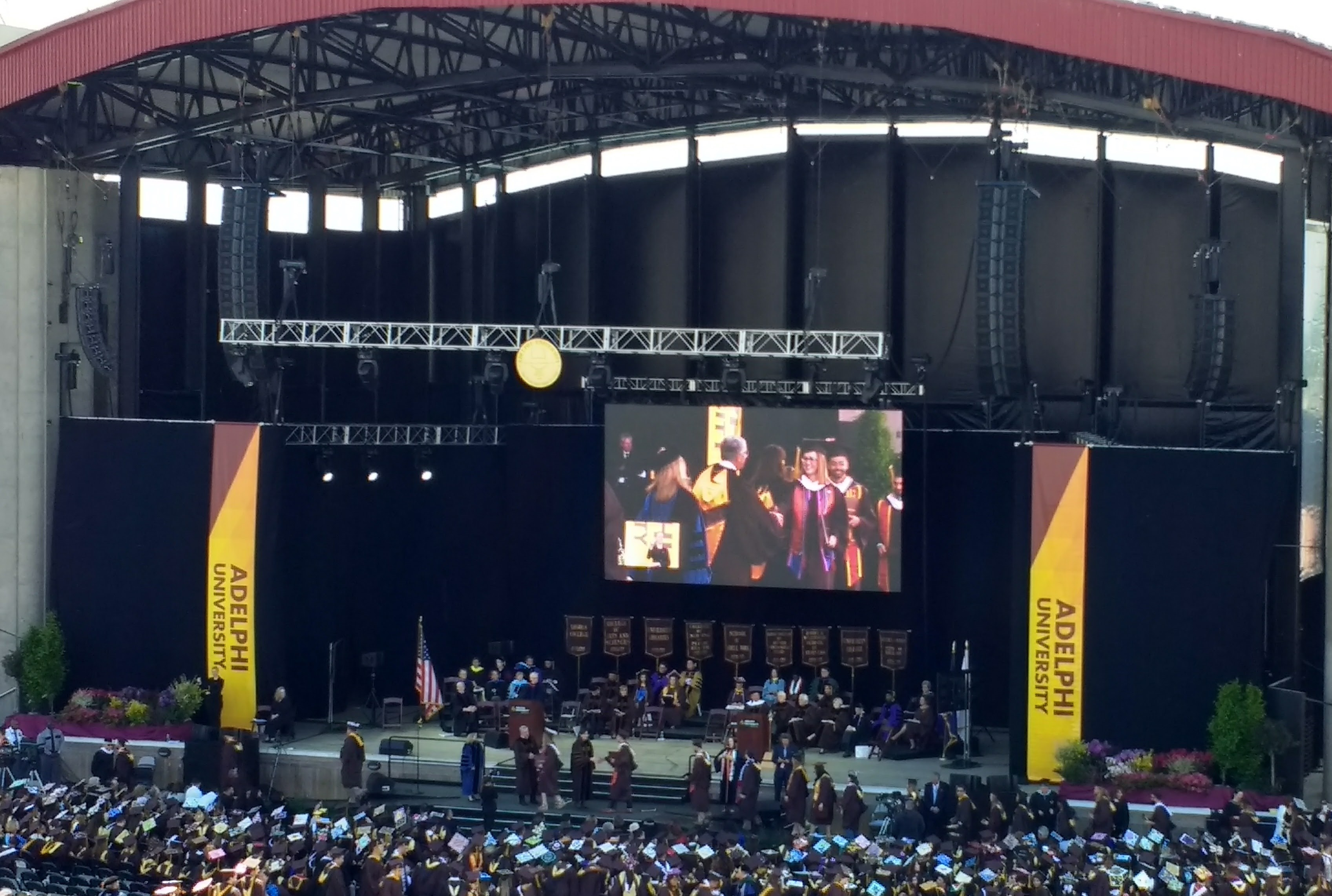
The 2017 Adelphi University Graduation, held at the Jones Beach Theater.

The university's School of Social Work is home to the Adelphi New York Statewide Breast Cancer Hotline and Support Program The program began in 1980 as the Woman-to-Woman Hotline, a free and confidential service to help women with breast cancer. It is the second oldest breast cancer hotline in the United States; over 100 trained volunteers offer information and emotional support for people with breast cancer. There are professional social workers, bilingual Spanish-speaking staff and support staff, along with support groups, educational programs and individual counseling.

== Academics ==
=== Rankings ===
Academic rankings

National
- Forbes: 353
- U.S. News & World Report: 189
- Washington Monthly: 238
- WSJ/College Pulse: 208

Global
- THE: 1501+

In 2015, Adelphi University was ranked #17 in New York State by average professor salaries.

In the 2026 U.S. News & World Report rankings, Adelphi was tied for No. 189 among National Universities. Forbes again ranked Adelphi the highest‑ranked private university on Long Island for the third consecutive year, and the Wall Street Journal recognized the university for social mobility and salary outcomes. Newsweek included Adelphi at No. 99 on its America's Top Online Colleges 2026 list, and the university appeared in the Times Higher Education World University Rankings for the fourth consecutive year.

=== Colleges, schools and degrees ===
- College of Arts and Sciences: B.A., B.S., B.F.A., M.A., M.S., M.F.A.,
- College of Professional and Continuing Studies: A.A., A.S., A.A.S., B.A., B.S., Post-baccalaureate Certificate, M.S.
- Gordon F. Derner School of Psychology: B.A., M.A., M.S., Ph.D., Psy.D.
- Ruth S. Ammon School of Education: B.A., B.S., M.A., Advanced Certificates, Au.D., Ph.D.
- Robert B Willumstad School of Business: B.S., B.A., B.B.A., M.S., M.B.A., M.S./M.B.A. (with School of Nursing).
- College of Nursing and Public Health: B.S., M.S., M.S./M.B.A. (with School of Business), Ph.D.
- School of Social Work: B.S.W., M.S.W., D.S.W., Ph.D.
- Honors College

On February 27, 2012, president Robert A. Scott announced a gift of $9.5 million from Adelphi Board of Trustees Chairman Robert B. Willumstad '05 (Hon.). The Adelphi University School of Business, established in 1964, was renamed the Robert B. Willumstad School of Business in his honor.

=== Joint degree programs ===
- Dentistry: New York University College of Dentistry (3–4 B.S./D.D.S.)
- Engineering: Columbia University,(3–2 B.A./B.S.)
- Environmental Studies: Columbia University (3–2 B.A./B.S. or 4–2 B.A./M.S.)
- Optometry: SUNY State College of Optometry (3–4 B.S./O.D.)
- Osteopathic Medicine: Touro College of Osteopathic Medicine (3–4 B.S./D.O.)
- Physical Therapy: New York Medical College (4–3 B.S./D.P.T.)

== Main campus buildings ==
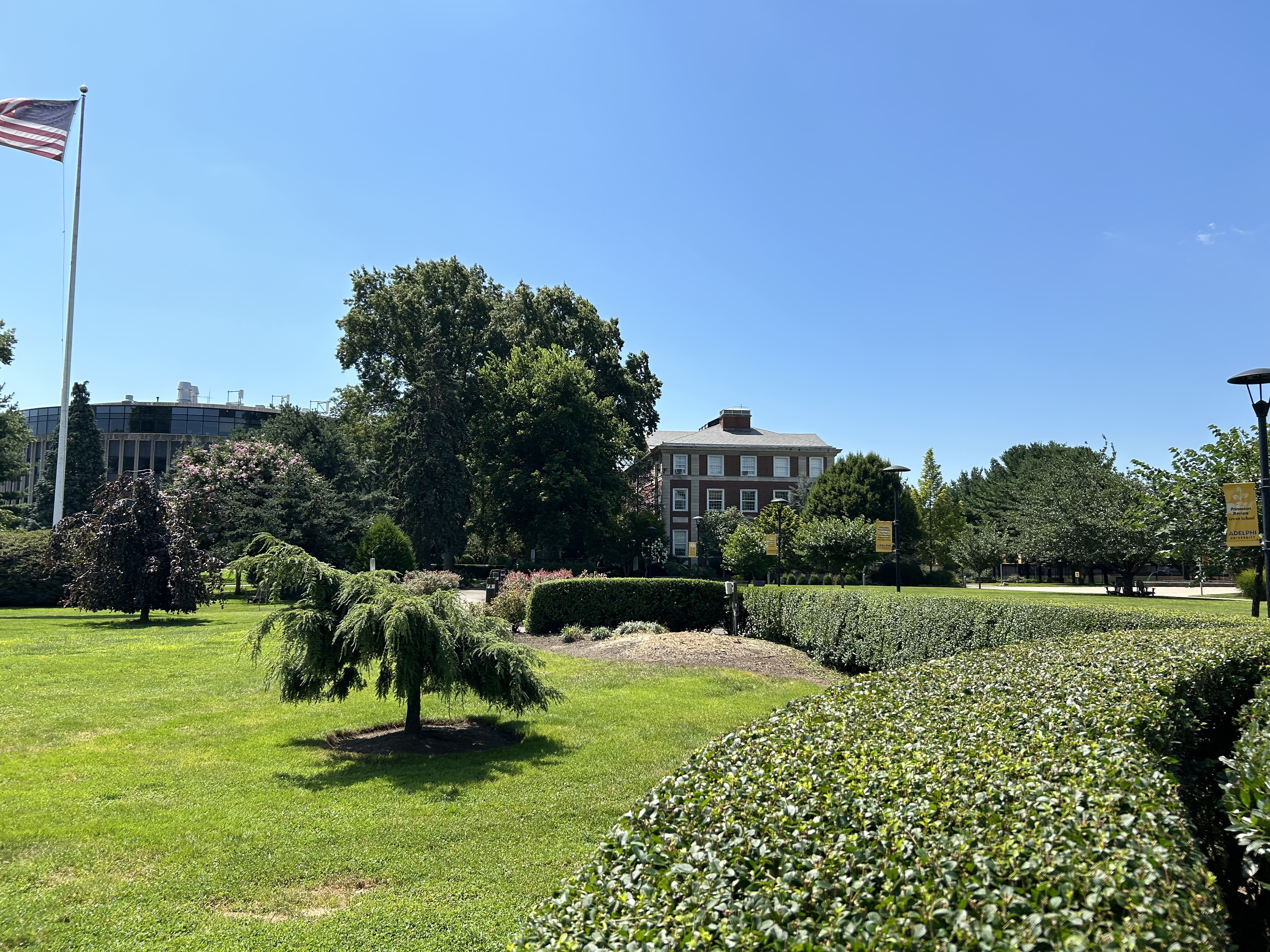
University Quad - Science Building and Blodgett Hall

Many of the buildings on the Garden City campus are symmetrical in nature. This is likely because garden cities are typically planned symmetrically. For example, Woodruff Hall has a second chimney solely to preserve the symmetry of the building.

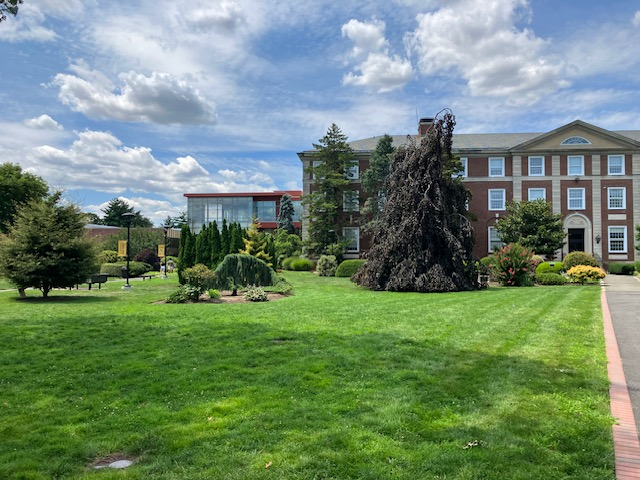
Nexus Building and Levermore Hall

== Student life ==
=== Student organizations ===
Adelphi student activities include academic interests, cultural and language clubs, sports and recreation, religious / Interfaith Center, arts organizations, volunteer opportunities, fraternities, and sororities.

=== LGBTQ community ===
The Campus Pride Index awarded Adelphi five out of five stars for LGBTQ-friendly campuses. Student resources include the Multicultural Center, SafeZones and SafeZone training, Gender-inclusive housing options, availability of designated all-gender restrooms, organizations and events (including Gender and Sexuality Alliance, Coming Out Day, Pride Week, Transgender Awareness Week), an Alumni Affinity group, mentoring, support and counseling.

== Athletics ==
The Adelphi Panthers are the athletic teams of Adelphi University. The Panthers compete at the NCAA Division II level for all sports and have been a member of the Northeast-10 Conference since 2009.

Since transitioning to the Northeast-10, the Adelphi Panthers have played in the East Region. In 2013, the Panthers were awarded the 2013 Northeast-10 Presidents' Cup, an honor awarded to the institution that compiles the most total points from all of its programs competing in league championships.

== Notable alumni and faculty ==
Notable alumni of the university include entertainers Chuck D and Flavor Flav of rap group Public Enemy, playwright Jonathan Larson, author and MacArthur Fellow Jacqueline Woodson, athlete Mike Windischmann, who was captain of the 1990 United States World Cup soccer team, advertising executive Ruth Fanshaw Waldo, and Prime Minister of Sint Maarten Leona Marlin-Romeo.

Notable faculty have included sex educator and Holocaust survivor Dr. Ruth, Pulitzer Prize-winning composer Paul Moravec, and US Labor Secretary Frances Perkins.
