= Carlow College =

Carlow College may mean:

In Carlow, County Carlow, Ireland:

- Institute of Technology, Carlow
- St. Patrick's, Carlow College

In Pittsburgh, Pennsylvania, United States:

- Carlow University
