= The Point of Pittsburgh =

2008 history book by Charles McCollester

The Point of Pittsburgh: Production and Struggle at the Forks of the Ohio
- Author: Charles McCollester
- Cover artist: Bill Yund
- Language: English
- Subject: History of the United States
- Genre: Nonfiction
- Publisher: Battle of Homestead Foundation
- Publication date: September 1, 2008
- Publication place: United States
- Media type: Print (paperback)
- Pages: 456
- ISBN: 978-0-9818894-1-2

The Point of Pittsburgh: Production and Struggle at the Forks of the Ohio is an American history book by Charles McCollester, a labor historian and activist, who argues that Pittsburgh, Pennsylvania was the key to the industrial development that made the United States a world power. He also links the struggle of the region's people for democratic rights and a decent standard of living to the creation of the American middle class.

While many books document the role played by the Pittsburgh industrialists Andrew Carnegie, Andrew Mellon, and Henry Clay Frick, McCollester tells a rarely told people's history of the Indians and the workers in Western Pennsylvania. McCollester describes those who first stood at the Forks of the Ohio, those who dug the coal, tended the furnaces, wrested the iron, steel, glass and aluminum from raw material, who built the boats, the bridges, the rail equipment and the generators, the skyscrapers, the highways, built the homes, and raised the families.

The book was published in November 2008, the 250th anniversary of Pittsburgh's founding.

== See also ==
- History of Pittsburgh

== Sources ==
Books in Print. Bowker, 2008.

- Book Website for The Point of Pittsburgh
- "The Point of Pittsburgh Social Network Page"
- Post-Gazette story on the book
- City Paper review of the book
