= Marylouise Fennell =

American college president (1939–2022)

Marylouise Fennell (1939–2022) was an American religious sister, educator, and academic administrator. She was the president of Carlow University from 1982 to 1989.

== Early life and education ==
Fennell was born in 1939, in Bridgeport, Connecticut. She entered the Sisters of Mercy of the Americas in 1957, following high school. She earned a bachelor's degree from the Diocesan Sisters College in 1961, a master's degree from the University of Hartford in 1972, and a Ph.D. in education from Boston University in 1976. She held post-doctoral appointments at Harvard University and the University of Connecticut.

== Career ==
Fennell was a clinical professor at the University of Hartford from 1971 to 1974, and a teaching fellow at Boston University from 1974 to 1976. She was on the faculty at the University of St. Joseph from 1976 until 1982 when she was the dean of the graduate school. She was named president of Carlow University in 1982, a position she held until 1989. After leaving Carlow University, Fennell moved into the private sector to work in public relations. Fennell was one of the founders of the Association of Private Universities of Central America, which works to expand private higher education in Central America. She also worked outside academia, and was appointed by Governor Ella Grasso to be vice chair of the first Connecticut State Election Commission, a role she held from 1978 to 1982. In 1999, Tom Ridge named Fennell a Distinguished Daughter of Pennsylvania.

Fennell died in 2022.

== Honors and awards ==
Both Boston University (in 2002) and the University of Hartford (in 1998) recognized Fennell as distinguished alumni.
