= Patricia McCann =

Catholic nun from Pittsburgh, Pennsylvania, United States

Sister Patricia McCann RSM
- Education: Mount Mercy College (now Carlow University)
- Occupations: Nun; teacher; activist
- Years active: 1965 to present
- Organizations: McAuley Ministries; Institute of the Sisters of Mercy
- Known for: Civil and political rights activism in the United States
- Religion: Roman Catholicism
- Congregations served: Sisters of Mercy (1955–present)
- Offices held: Vice President, Institute of the Sisters of Mercy of the Americas; Regional chair and national executive secretary, Leadership Conference of Women Religious

Sr. Patricia McCann RSM is a teacher, activist, and sister of the Sisters of Mercy from Pittsburgh, Pennsylvania, in the United States.

McCann commenced her novitiate in 1955 and took her vows in 1961. She attended Mount Mercy College and became a high school and college history teacher. Among her most notable achievements, McCann lead a delegation from Pittsburgh to attend the Selma to Montgomery marches in March 1965.

McCann has served as the Vice President of the Institute of the Sisters of Mercy of the Americas; as a regional chair for the Leadership Conference of Women Religious and a term as national executive secretary; and as a founding board member of McAuley Ministries based in Pittsburgh. In 2020, McCann celebrated her 65th anniversary of joining the Sisters of Mercy.

== Selma march ==
In March 1965, McCann was one of several religious representatives that lead a delegation of students and activists from Duquesne University, the University of Pittsburgh, Chatham College, and Mount Mercy College (Carlow) that attended the Selma march at the invitation of the John Lewis and the Student Nonviolent Coordinating Committee. Upon arriving in Selma, authorities boarded the delegation's buses, suspicious of their intentions of the group's travels in the region. Later on, the Pittsburgh university delegation came under attack by the mounted police on patrol of the march. In an interview with SLB Radio, McCann described the attack:

They had these whips that had nails at the end of the-the leather coming out of the whips, and they were just going after these groups of kids, black kids, white kids, there were all kinds of kids there who would come from college all over the United States. We ran up onto the porch of the house of people who took us in, the black community there, and for three days that we were there, they fed us.

After three days, the violence against the Selma marchers ceased with the arrival of Dr. Martin Luther King Jr., who visited Selma to support the march. McCann, alongside her colleague Sister DeLellis Laboon, were later greeted by Dr. King, who advised them to remove all signage indicating Pittsburgh as their destination as a precaution.

== See also ==
- Bloody Tuesday (1964)
- Civil rights movement
- List of peace activists
