= Alice L. Laffey =

American Biblical scholar (1944–2023)

- Born: December 1, 1944; Pittsburgh, Pennsylvania, U.S.
- Died: July 30, 2023 (aged 78); Massachusetts, U.S.
- Occupations: Biblical scholar, college professor

Academic work
- Discipline: Religious studies
- Sub-discipline: Biblical studies
- Institutions: College of the Holy Cross

Alice L. Laffey (December 1, 1944 – July 30, 2023) was an American feminist Biblical scholar. From 1981 to 2016, she was a professor at the College of the Holy Cross in Massachusetts, where she was head of the religious studies department. She was a member of the congregation of the Sisters of Mercy in the 1970s.

== Early life and education ==
Laffey was born in Pittsburgh, the daughter of John J. Laffey and Marion Caveney Laffey. She graduated from Mount Mercy College in 1967, and earned a Master of Divinity degree from Pittsburgh Theological Seminary in 1973. In 1981, she became the first woman to earn a Doctorate of Sacred Scripture (D.S.S.) degree from the Pontifical Biblical Institute in Rome.

== Career ==
Laffey taught at the College of the Holy Cross for 35 years, from 1981 to 2016, and introduced courses on feminist, postcolonial and ecological perspectives on theology. She was the first recipient of the college's Marfuggi Award for Academic Advising. She also taught at Hartford Seminary, Boston College, Episcopal Divinity School, St. John's University, the University of San Francisco, and other religious institutions.

Laffey was a member of the Sisters of Mercy in the 1970s, and participated in the Women's Ordination Conference. She raised funds for the founding of the Nativity School in Worcester, a Jesuit-run all-scholarship middle school for boys, and served on the school's board. She was a member of the Catholic Biblical Association, the Society of Biblical Literature, the Catholic Theological Society of America, and the American Academy of Religion.

As a prominent woman in Catholic scholarship in the United States, Laffey was called upon to comment on the church's positions concerning women, including Pope John Paul II's Apostolic letter Mulieris dignitatem ("On the dignity and vocation of women") in 1988.

== Publications ==
Laffey's publications were mainly commentaries on Old Testament scriptures, and work on feminist theology. She also regularly reviewed books for the Catholic Biblical Quarterly and Cross-Currents.

=== Academic articles ===
- Laffey, Alice (July 1977). "Printing: A Tool to Recapture the Spoken Word". The Bible Translator. 28 (3): 306–312. doi:10.1177/026009357702800302. ISSN 2051-6770.

=== Books ===
- Laffey, Alice L. (1988). An Introduction to the Old Testament: A Feminist Perspective. Fortress Press. ISBN 978-1-4514-0358-9.
- Laffey, Alice L. (1990). Wives, Harlots and Concubines: The Old Testament in Feminist Perspective. SPCK. ISBN 978-0-281-04492-4.
- Laffey, Alice L. (1997). Appreciating God's Creation Through Scripture. Paulist Press. ISBN 978-0-8091-3714-5.
- Laffey, Alice L. (1998). The Pentateuch: A Liberation-critical reading. Minneapolis, Minn: Fortress Press. ISBN 978-0-8006-2872-7.
- Laffey, Alice L. (2012). First and Second Kings. Liturgical Press. ISBN 978-0-8146-2843-0.
- Laffey, Alice L.; Leonard-Fleckman, Mahri (2017-07-19). Ruth. Liturgical Press. ISBN 978-0-8146-8132-9.

=== Chapters ===
- Newsom, Carol Ann; Ringe, Sharon H., eds. (1998-01-01). "1 and 2 Chronicles". Women's Bible Commentary. Westminster John Knox Press. ISBN 978-0-664-25781-1.

=== Online articles ===
- Laffey, Alice L. (2013-07-31). "What the pope left out about women". CNN.

== Personal life ==
Laffey died in 2023, at the age of 78.
