= Barbara K. Mistick =

American academic leader

4th President of the National Association of Independent Colleges and Universities
- Incumbent
- Assumed office September 1, 2019
- Preceded by: David L. Warren

Personal details
- Born: May 1, 1955 (age 71)
- Education: Carlow University (BS); University of Pittsburgh (MBA); Case Western Reserve University (PhD)

Barbara K. Mistick is the president of the National Association of Independent Colleges and Universities. She assumed the presidency in September 2019. She was formerly the president of Wilson College from July 2011 to August 2019.

Mistick helped the private non-profit higher education sector navigate the U.S. federal government's response to the COVID-19 pandemic and the various rounds of relief funding.

== Education ==
Mistick earned her B.S. in Business from Carlow University in 1991. She then attended the University of Pittsburgh Katz Graduate School of Business where she earned her MBA in 1993. In 2004, Mistick earned her doctorate in Management from Weatherhead School of Management at Case Western Reserve University.

== Career ==
From June 2005 to June 2011, Mistick was the first woman President and Director of the Carnegie Library of Pittsburgh. In 2008, Barbara K. Mistick, then the president and director of the Carnegie Library of Pittsburgh and David M. Shribman, the executive editor of the Pittsburgh Post-Gazette worked together to produce "Pittsburgh 1758 - 2008."

From 2011 to 2019, she was president of Wilson College in Chambersburg, Pennsylvania. She became president of the National Association of Independent Colleges and Universities in September 2019. Mistick's tenure coincided with the COVID-19 pandemic, and worked to help private colleges navigate the impact of the pandemic.

== Bibliography ==
Mistick is the co-author of Stretch: How to Future-Proof Yourself for Tomorrow's Workplace (2008). The book was written in conjunction with Karie Willyerd and provides readers recommendations on how to stay relevant in professional settings amid a changing labor market.
