= National Association of Independent Colleges and Universities =

Organization of private US colleges and universities

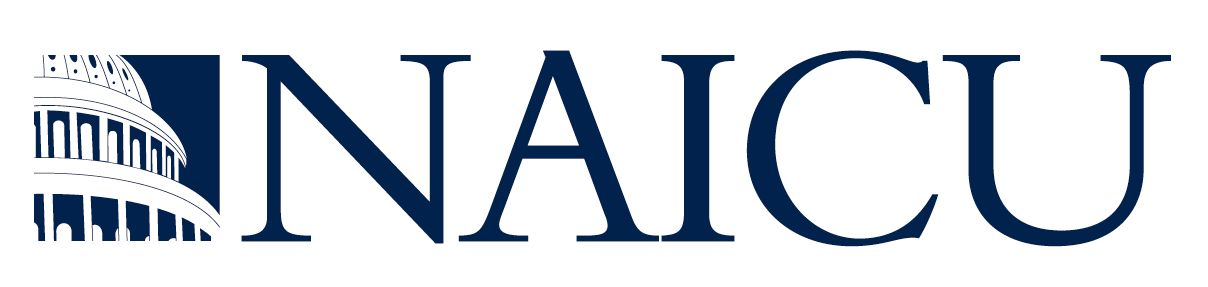
- Formation: 1976; 50 years ago
- Type: Education policy nonprofit
- Tax ID no.: 52-1125164
- Legal status: 501(c)(3)
- Headquarters: 1025 Connecticut Avenue, N.W., Suite 700, Washington D.C., U.S.
- Location: United States
- Members: 1000+
- Key people: Barbara K. Mistick, president
- Staff: 20
- Website: https://www.naicu.edu

The National Association of Independent Colleges and Universities (NAICU) is a nonprofit 501(c)(3) located in Washington D.C. It is an organization of private American colleges and universities. Founded in 1976, it is made up of over 1,000 independent higher education institutions.

NAICU staff meets with policymakers, helps coordinate the joint activities of state-level private college associations, and advises members of legislative and regulatory developments with potential impact on their institutions.

NAICU has three main federal advocacy goals. First, to ensure that federal student aid programs help to provide all Americans with access to the college of their choice. Second, to seek appropriate regulation of private colleges and universities that is sensitive to their diversity and independence while addressing society's needs. And third, to promote tax policies that help families pay for college and also helps private colleges fulfill their distinctive missions.

In addition, NAICU works cooperatively with its fellow presidential associations, as well as the many other specialized higher education associations, in spearheading major public initiatives. Such projects include: the Student Aid Alliance, an effort to enhance funding for existing student aid programs; the non-partisan National Campus Voter Registration Project that helps colleges and universities encourage voter registration and increase voter education in presidential and congressional elections; and CampusCares, a national campaign to recognize the community service performed by millions of students, faculty and staff.

NAICU developed the University and College Accountability Network (U-CAN), a tool for prospective students and their parents to complement guides like U.S. News & World Report, which has been the focus of criticism. U-CAN allows parents and students to compare characteristics of private colleges and universities based on what students and parents actually want to know.

== Presidents ==
1. John Phillips (1976–1986) - Founding President
2. Richard Rosser (1986–1993)
3. David L. Warren (1993–2019)
4. Barbara K. Mistick (2019–present)

== See also ==
- Association of Independent Colleges and Universities of Pennsylvania (AICUP)
