= Margo J. Anderson =

American historian

- Education: Bucknell University; Rutgers University (PhD)
- Scientific career
- Fields: Statistics
- Workplaces: Vassar College; University of Wisconsin–Milwaukee

Margo J. Anderson (also published as Margo Anderson Conk) is an American social historian and historian of statistics known for her studies of the United States Census and on the history of Pittsburgh and Milwaukee. She is a distinguished professor of history at the University of Wisconsin–Milwaukee, and a former president of the Social Science History Association.

== Education and career ==
Anderson studied history as an undergraduate at Bucknell University, graduating summa cum laude in 1967. She earned a master's degree and PhD from Rutgers University in 1972 and 1978 respectively.

She taught briefly as an instructor at Vassar College before joining the University of Wisconsin–Milwaukee faculty in 1977. At Milwaukee, she chaired the history department from 1992 to 1995, directed the Urban Studies Program from 2001 to 2005, and became a distinguished professor in 2013.

She was president of the Social Science History Association in 2006.

== Books ==
Anderson is the author or editor of:

- The United States Census and Labor Force Change: A History of Occupation Statistics, 1870-1940 (UMI Research Press, 1980)
- The American Census: A Social History (Yale Univ. Press, 1988; 2nd ed., 2015)
- Pittsburgh Surveyed: Social Science and Social Reform in the Early Twentieth Century (edited with Maurine W. Greenwald, 1996)
- Encyclopedia of the U.S. Census (edited with Constance F. Citro and Joseph J. Salvo; CQ Press, 2000; 2nd ed., 2012)
- Who Counts? The Politics of Census-Taking in Contemporary America (with Stephen Fienberg; Russell Sage 1999 and 2001)
- Perspectives on Milwaukee's Past (edited with Victor Greene; University of Illinois Press, 2009)
- Bibliography of Metropolitan Milwaukee (with Ann M. Graf and Amanda I. Seligman; Marquette University Press, 2014)

== Awards and honors ==
Anderson became a fellow of the American Statistical Association in 1998.
