= University and College Accountability Network =

The University and College Accountability Network (U-CAN) provides information for prospective students and their parents to compare American private colleges and universities across a wide variety of characteristics. Users can search for participating institutions and compare important data and information, including admissions, cost, financial aid, popular majors, and campus safety. Links to the institutions' websites provide a "virtual campus tour."

U-CAN was publicly launched on September 26, 2007. At the time of the launch, more than 600 institutions had volunteered to participate. The network was developed by the National Association of Independent Colleges and Universities (NAICU).

On September 17, 2008, U-CAN launched enhanced features designed in response to focus groups. Features included an advanced search that increased the number of searchable fields from three to 17.

U-CAN represents the first time that colleges and universities have voluntarily joined and self-developed a system to provide data and information for prospective students. Other systems are under development by the National Association of State Universities and Land-Grant Colleges, the American Association of State Colleges and Universities, and the American Association of Universities. These are expected to be released publicly in 2009,

As of September 2008, information on more than 660 colleges and universities was available to the public, and another 75 had agreed to participate but had not yet publicly posted their data.
