= Pittsburgh riot =

1886 race riot in the United States

The Pittsburgh riot was a 19th-century race riot in which an armed clash between Irish American and Italian-American laborers resulted in one man seriously injured and the death of another on September 19, 1886.

During the mid-1880s, relations between Irish-Americans and Italian-Americans had been steadily worsening, as the Italians had for some time been encroaching the working-class neighborhood of Four Mile Run in the 15th Ward of Pittsburgh, Pennsylvania.

The previous Saturday, an Italian laborer, Joseph Vernard, was attacked by a gang of six Irish laborers headed by the Daly brothers and, although severely injured, managed to escape to his home.

Although no further activity was reported during the week, around twenty Irish laborers approached Vernand's boardinghouse on the afternoon of September 19 and demanded entry.

When the other Italian residents responded by barring the doors, the Irish mob managed to force their way in by breaking the doors down.

As violent fighting broke out within the boardinghouse, Italian laborer "Paddy" Rocco had his skull crushed by a chair and an Irishman, Patrick Constantine, was fatally shot in the abdomen.

When the rioters had realized the injuries of the two men, all those involved had fled by the time the police arrived. Although both Rocco and Constantine were still alive by the arrival of the police, Constantine died in a hospital several hours later.

Five Italians were arrested in connection to the riots, although the unidentified Irish rioters were never apprehended.
