= Carlow University =

Catholic university in Pittsburgh, Pennsylvania, US

Coordinates: 40.4397°N 79.9641°W

- Former names: Mount Mercy College (1929–1969); Carlow College (1969–2004)
- Motto: Ad Superna, non Superba (Latin)
- Motto in English: "To the Eternal, not the Perishable"
- Type: Private university
- Established: September 24, 1929; 96 years ago
- Founder: Sisters of Mercy
- Religious affiliation: Catholic (Sisters of Mercy)
- Academic affiliations: Conference for Mercy Higher Education; ACCU; MSA; CIC
- President: Kathy Humphrey
- Provost: Sibdas Ghosh
- Students: 2,419 (fall 2024)
- Undergraduates: 1,358 (fall 2024)
- Postgraduates: 1,061 (fall 2024)
- Location: Pittsburgh, Pennsylvania, United States
- Campus: 14 acres (5.7 ha); Urban
- Chaplain: Mark Thomas
- Colors: Purple & Gold
- Sporting affiliations: NCAA – AMCC; USCAA – Independent
- Mascot: Celtics
- Website: www.carlow.edu
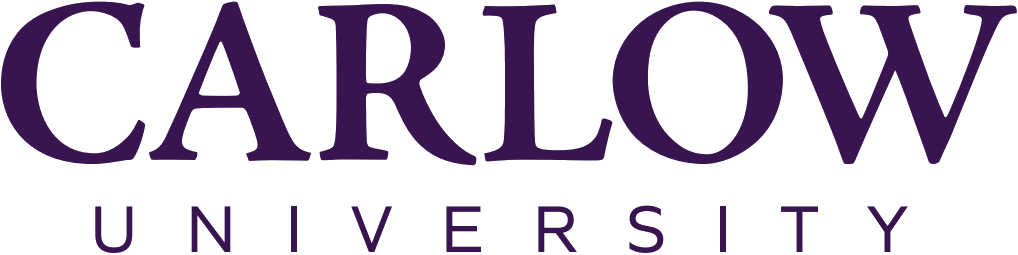

Carlow University is a private Catholic university in Pittsburgh, Pennsylvania, United States. Founded in 1929 by the Sisters of Mercy, it enrolled over 2,400 students as of fall 2024. The university's athletic teams are known as the Celtics, reflecting its Irish heritage.

== History ==
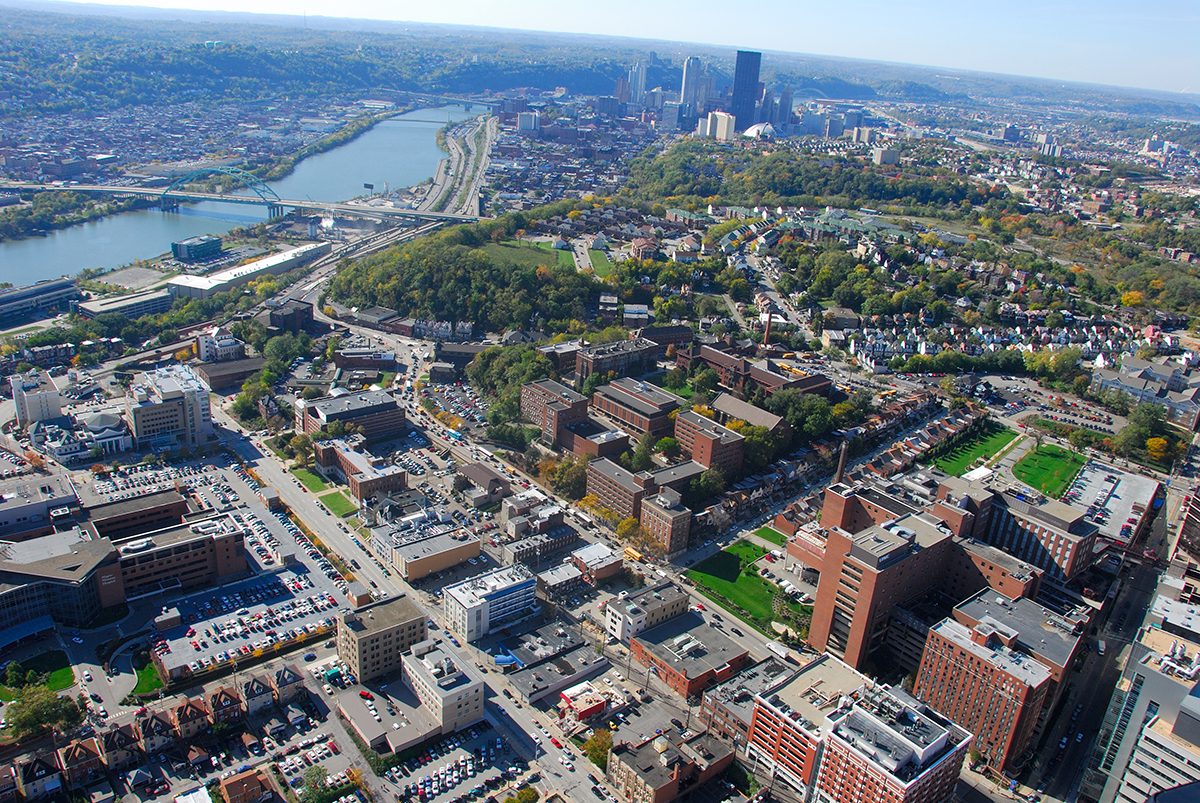
Aerial view of the university campus

The Sisters of Mercy arrived in Pittsburgh on December 21, 1843. They traveled from County Carlow, Ireland to the Oakland area of Pittsburgh. They purchased 13 acres (5.3 ha) within the Diocese of Pittsburgh, and established a new motherhouse, as well as Our Lady of Mercy Academy.

In 1929, the Sisters of Mercy opened Mount Mercy College, with the first commencement ceremony in 1933. Key campus buildings were constructed during the early years, including Aquinas Hall in 1936 and Trinity Hall in 1941. The college admitted men under the G.I. Bill in 1945, with Peter F. Flaherty, who went on to become a two-term Mayor of Pittsburgh and Allegheny County Commissioner, among the first male students.

In 1948, Antonian Hall opened, with office, classroom, and theater space. Thirteen years later, in 1961, Frances Warde Hall dormitory opened on campus. Prior to this, students lived in houses or halls in the surrounding area. Mount Mercy College's name was changed to Carlow College in 1969. A year later, Curran Hall was renovated to house the nursing school. In 1975, Carlow's mission statement was drafted. In 1978, Carlow College offered what few institutions of higher education did at the time: accelerated classes designed for working adults.

In 2004, Carlow College officially became Carlow University, and a year later appointed its first lay president, Mary Hines.

In fall 2012, Carlow began competition in men's and women's cross country, the first male sport offered at Carlow. Carlow announced on March 17, 2014, that it would field a men's basketball team for the 2014–2015 season. In September 2015, Carlow announced it would add men's soccer and men's and women's golf teams beginning in fall 2016. In December 2016, Carlow announced that it would add men's and women's track and field teams beginning in spring 2018.

== Academics ==
Academic rankings

Master's
- Washington Monthly: 234

Regional
- U.S. News & World Report: 113

Carlow University is organized into the College of Arts and Sciences, and the College of Health and Wellness. As of 2017–2018, Carlow's student body was predominantly female, with women comprising 84% and men 16% of the student population.

The university has three campuses—Oakland, Cranberry, and Greensburg. The main campus in Oakland spans 13 acres and includes 14 buildings, such as Frances Warde Hall and the Palumbo Hall of Science and Technology. The Sisters of Mercy Convent is a Pittsburgh History and Landmarks Foundation historic landmark and motherhouse for nearly 150 Sisters of Mercy. St. Agnes Church was built in 1916–17 and designed by noted Pittsburgh-based ecclesiastical architect John T. Comès. It was purchased by the university in 1996.

Since 1979, the Madwomen in the Attic program at Carlow University has created a space for writing, the exchange of ideas, and the publication of women's literature.

== Athletics ==
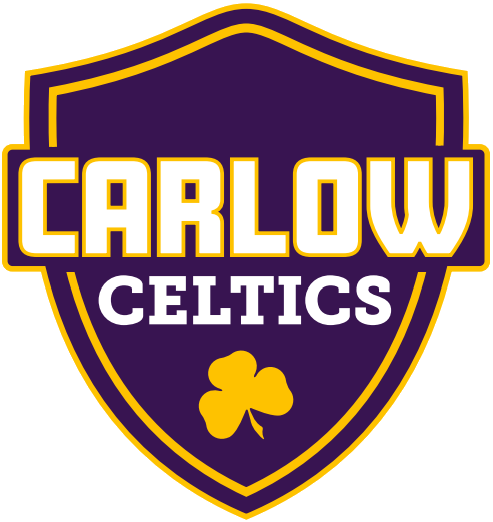
Carlow athletics logo

The Carlow athletic teams are called the Celtics. The university is a member of NCAA Division III, competing in the Allegheny Mountain Collegiate Conference since 2023. They are also a member of the United States Collegiate Athletic Association. The Celtics had previously competed in the NAIA and were affiliated with the American Mideast Conference and River States Conference.

Carlow competes in 17 intercollegiate varsity sports. Men's sports include basketball, cross country, golf, soccer, track & field (indoor and outdoor) and volleyball; while women's sports include basketball, cross country, golf, soccer, softball, tennis, track & field (indoor and outdoor) and volleyball; and co-ed sports include cheerleading.

== Notable people ==
=== Alumni ===
- Peter F. Flaherty, 54th mayor of Pittsburgh and 16th United States deputy attorney general
- Alice L. Laffey, feminist Biblical scholar
- Patricia McCann, teacher and activist
- Barbara K. Mistick, 4th president of the National Association of Independent Colleges and Universities
- Gloria Skurzynski, children and young adult book author

=== Faculty ===
- Jan Beatty, poet and radio personality
- Claudia Pinza Bozzolla, soprano singer and voice teacher
- Marylouise Fennell, religious sister and educator, college president from 1982 to 1989
