= Malden Inn =

- U.S. National Register of Historic Places
- Washington County History & Landmarks Foundation Landmark
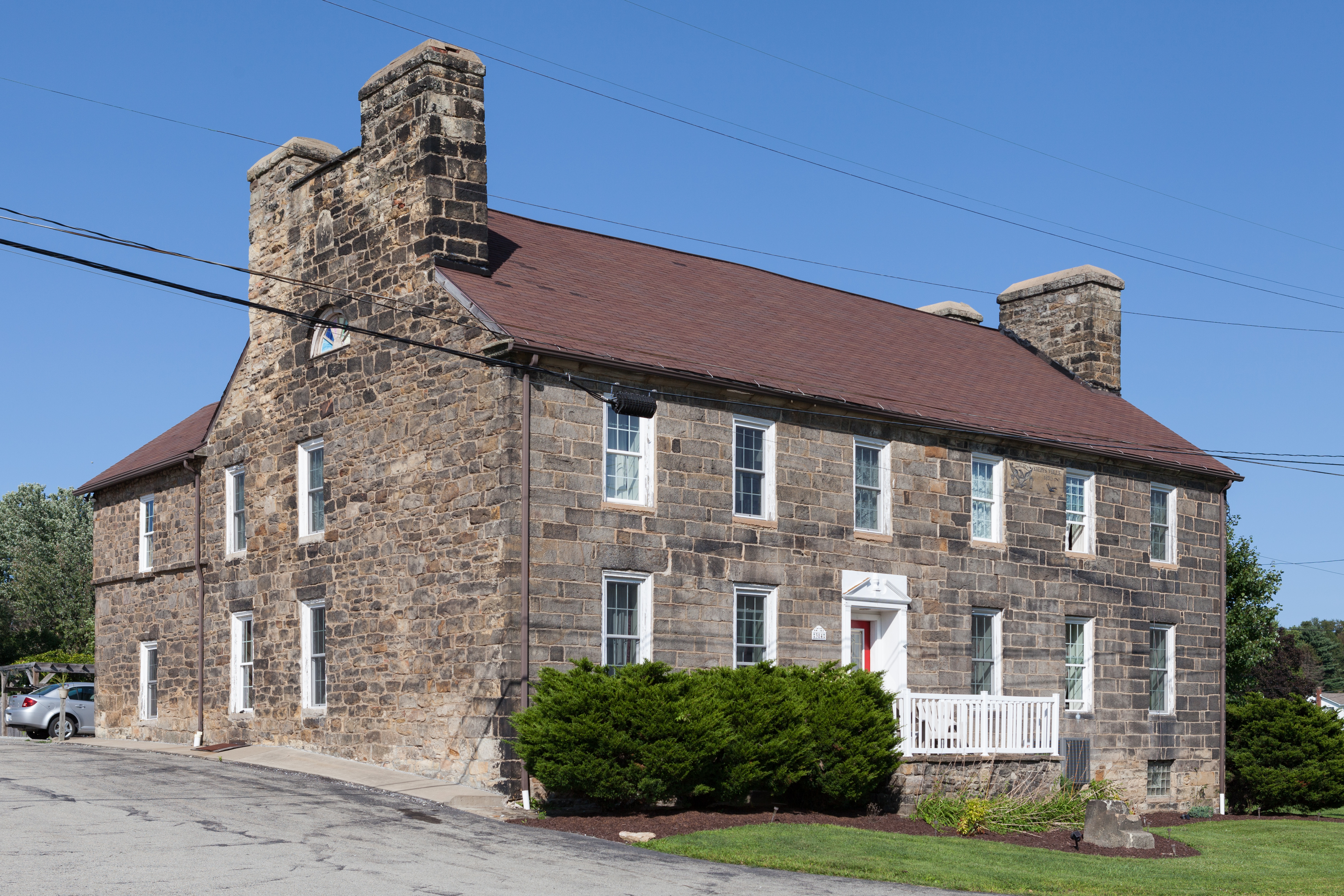
- Malden Inn in August 2014

- Location within Pennsylvania Location within the United States
- Nearest city: midway Centerville and West Brownsville, Pennsylvania
- Coordinates: 40°2′15″N 79°55′50″W
- Area: 1 acre (0.40 ha)
- Built: 1820
- Architectural style: Georgian
- NRHP reference No.: 74001805
- Added to NRHP: January 24, 1974

The Malden Inn (also known as The Kreppsville Inn or the John Krepps Tavern) is an historic building that is located in the unincorporated bedroom community of Malden, Pennsylvania, United States. It sits at the junction of South Malden Road and Old U.S. Route 40 (US 40).

It was designated as a historic residential landmark/farmstead by the Washington County History & Landmarks Foundation.

== History and architectural features ==
The inn's Malden location in the present-day borough of Centerville, Pennsylvania), on the western part of the Amerindian trail known as Nemacolin's Path, had been part of an early wagon road that linked the river ford between Brownsville–West Brownsville with the former frontier towns of Washington, Pennsylvania, and Wheeling, West Virginia, where the Emigrant Trail then allowed an easy crossing the Ohio River. The inn had a good commercial site on the old National Pike (US 40) about 3 miles (4.8 km) west of the long climb from West Brownsville and Denbo Heights. Located at the former junction of Malden Road, connecting northwards to Coal Center and California, it was situated about halfway to Centerville from the Brownsville ford and the ferry terminus below Blainsburg.

This inn was designated as a historic residential landmark/farmstead by the Washington County History & Landmarks Foundation.
