= Malden, Pennsylvania =

Unincorporated hamlet in Pennsylvania, U.S.

- A bedroom community in the Borough of Centerville
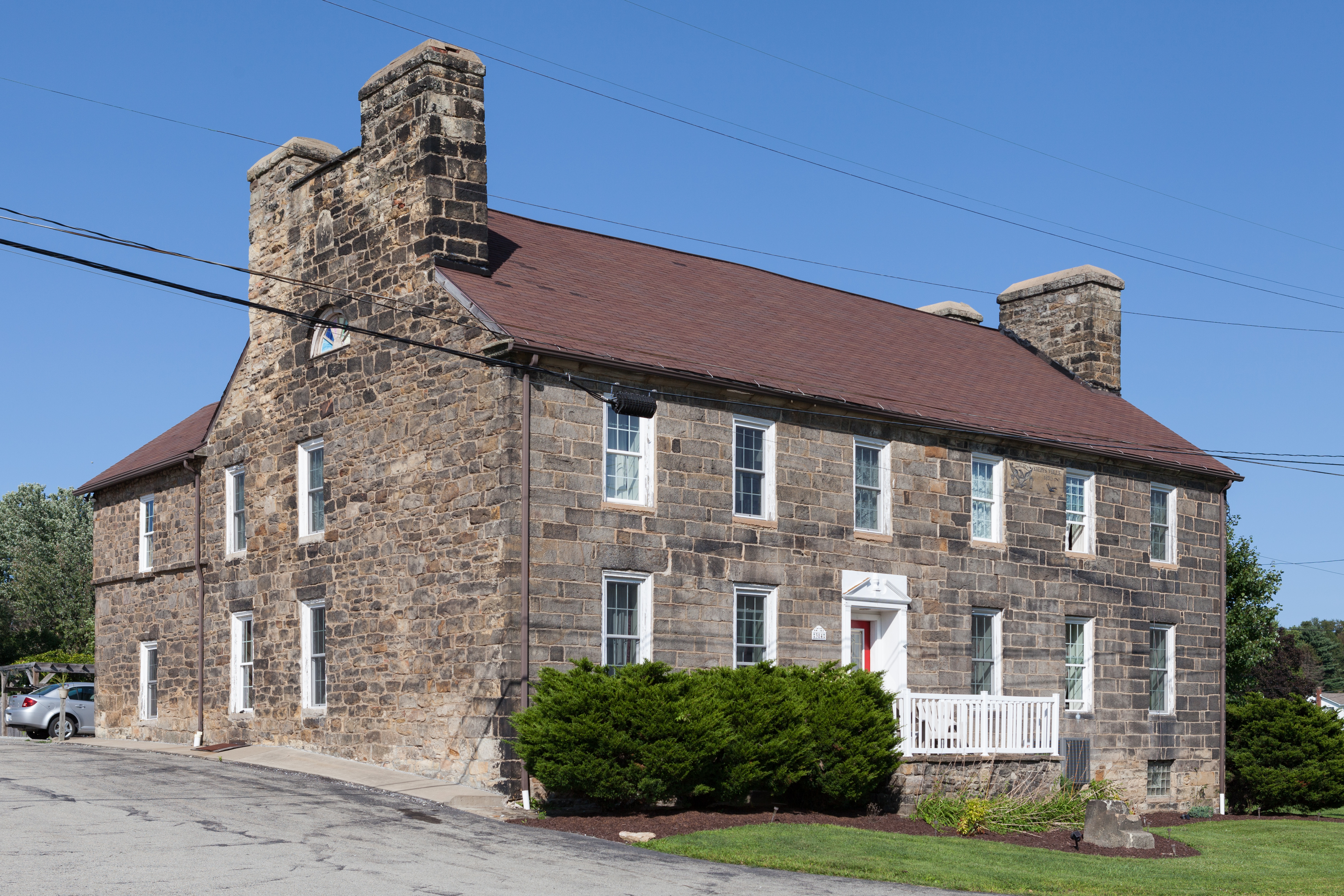
- Malden Inn in the borough's Centerville historic district in August 2014

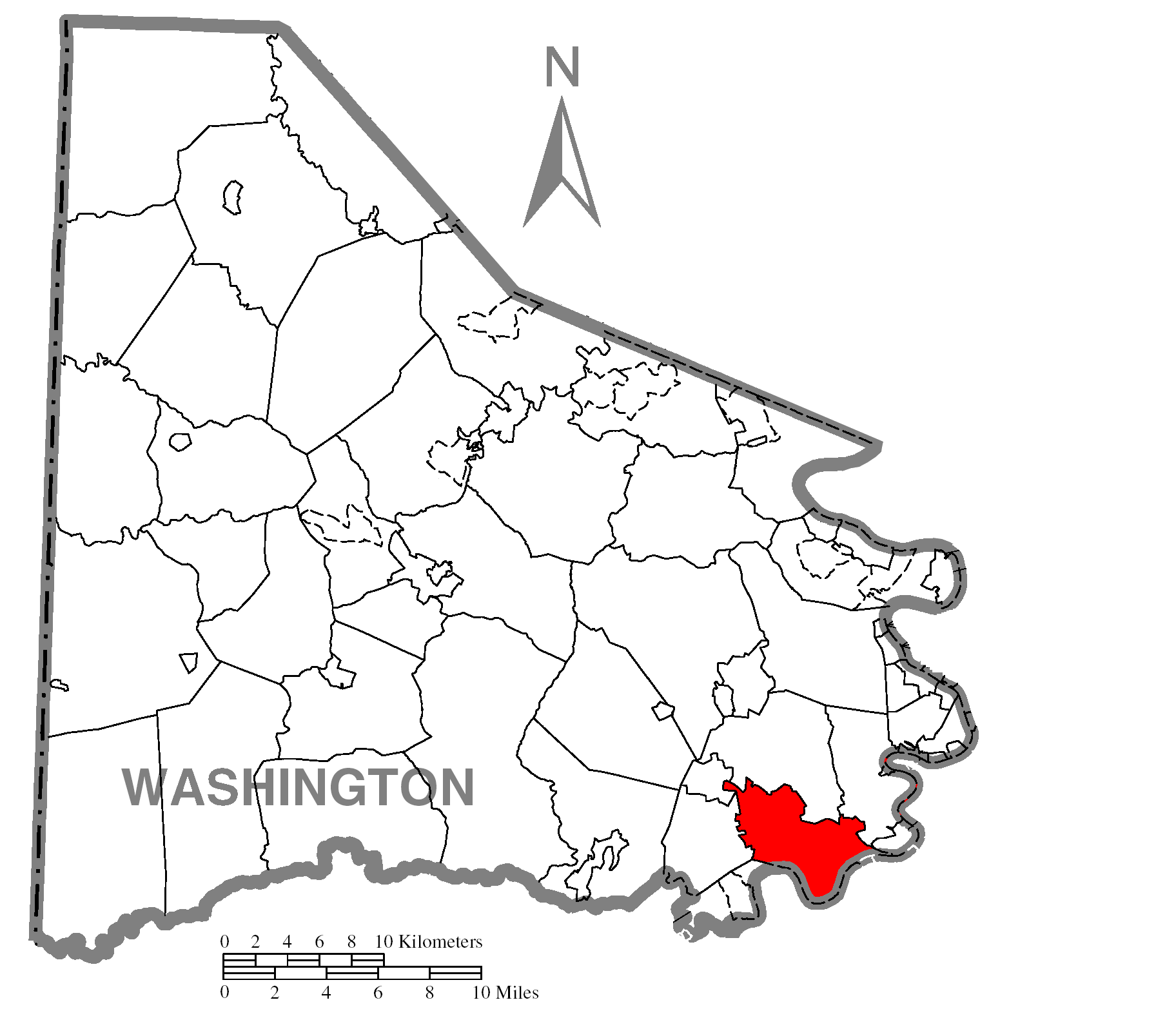
- Bedroom Community of Malden in the Borough of Centerville in Washington County, Pennsylvania.

- Location of Malden in Pennsylvania
- Coordinates: 40°2′16.1″N 79°55′41″W
- Country: United States
- State: Pennsylvania
- County: Washington
- Established: 1800
- John Krep's Tavern: 1820
- Founder: John Krep

Area Malden housing developments were limited to roadside dwellings until the 1950s. Most of the lands now made residential streets off to the side from the Old National Pike were probably farm lands until after WW-II ended.
  - Water: 0 sq mi (0 km^{2})
- Elevation: 1,181 ft (360 m)

Population (2010)
  - Total: several dozen houses
- Time zone: UTC-4 (EST)
  - Summer (DST): UTC-5 (EDT)
- zipcode: 15417
- Area code: 724 (Southwestern Pennsylvania)

The unincorporated hamlet of Malden is a bedroom community that is located on the historic 'Old National Pike' in borough of Centerville Washington County, Pennsylvania. Originally an early wagon stop in rural Pennsylvania, it became a small transportation hub during the surge of westward migration to the Northwest Territory after 1790.

Both Malden and the widespread rural Borough of Centerville share the 15417 postal zip code of the Brownsville, Pennsylvania post-office.

== History ==
Settled between 1780 and 1800, as the surge of emigration westward across the Alleghenies began with organization of the Northwest Territory by the new (first) US Congress, this area's relatively level geography atop the long climb along Nemacolin's Path and the National Road lent itself to emigrants resting their draft animal teams and making camp overnight to recuperate from their arduous treks. Brownsville subsequently developed into a river boat building and outfitting center with the entire four-county region supported by industries, including small foundries smelting local iron ores and producing iron goods and boat hardware, glass and pottery kilns, charcoal and firewood manufacturers, and lumber companies.

Accordingly, with a steady stream of people pushing westwards, one of the first structures erected was the Malden Inn, which also sat along the junction with Malden Road, connecting the plateau with California, Pennsylvania and other developing communities in the area. The Inn is located at one side of the small business district and houses Paci's Restaurant, which has operated since the 1930s. Located nearby, on the next block, opposite Malden Road, is another landmark, Cuppies Drive-In Theatre which opened in 1947. Sold by the family in 1976, it was renamed the Malden Drive-In Theater.

A commercial decline began in Malden during the early 1960s when an improvement project rerouted the path of US-40 away from the town's main street (Market Street) through the region's former gateway town, Brownsville, and away from the Old National Road and the former path of U.S. Route 40. Including a two-mile lead-in stretch of Market Street in upper Brownsville, roughly three miles of US-40 in eastern Washington County, Pennsylvania was rerouted across the Lane Bane Bridge to bypass the lower business district of downtown Brownsville about 1960–61 in an attempt to mitigate chronic traffic problems. The New US-40 resumes two lane operation and wyes with the Old National Road at the west end of the community.

The hamlet also has an old tavern landmark and former inn. Situated at a T-road junction, it is known as the "John Krepps Tavern" or the "Kreppsville Inn."

=== Present day ===
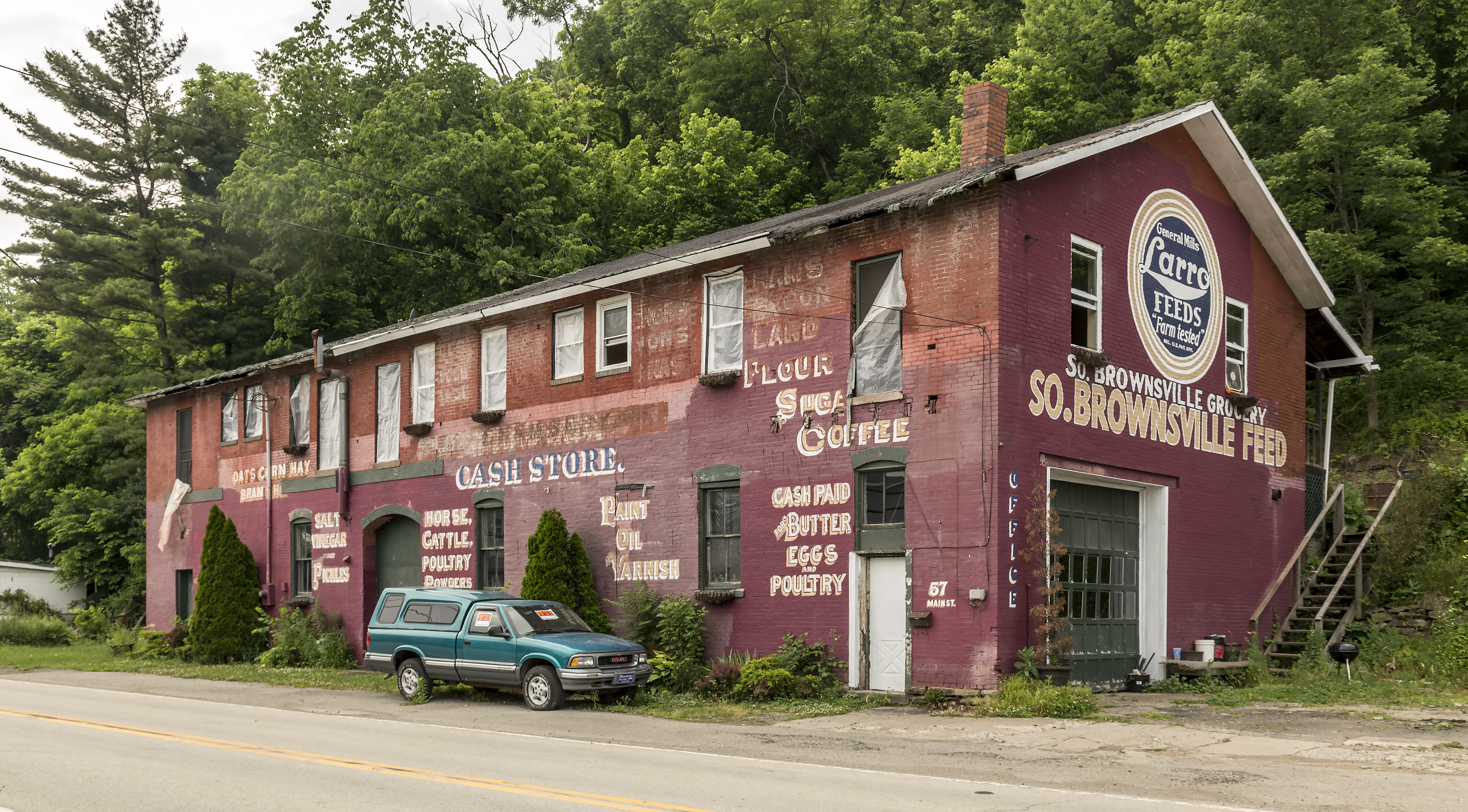
Country store, southern edge of West Brownsville sits in the zig-zag along PA 88 (Low Hill Road)

Today, as it has since the US-40 roadbed was flipped northerly to miss the road through West Brownsville, the hamlet sits in the apex of a westward pointing triangle formed by the intersection of the newer early 1960s four lane Highway improvement of U.S. Route 40 and the consequent by-pass of that stretch of old historic National Highway. Thus both US-40 bridges across the Monongahela River, the Lane Bane Bridge and the Brownsville-West Brownsville Bridge connect their respective (Old/New) US-40 routes, merging just to the west side of the Malden commercial strip. Old US 40 turns left, travels past the lower Brownsville business district and several congestion causing traffic lights before turning right to cross the older Brownsville Bridge, zig through the southern part of West Brownsville and climb to Malden's east side.

== Geography ==
Malden is situated along a 1.75-mile, relatively level strip of land on a stretch of Old U.S. Route 40 where initial housing lots line the road. Two multi-street housing developments, which were developed during the 1950s, are situated on each side of the highway. The development to the north is larger and has parallel streets trending up hill street to street. The southside development is an older loop, and has a fraction of the houses, but overlooks the Monongahela Valley's unincorporated communities of Denbeau Heights (formerly Denbo Heights) and Denbo.

Parent community Brownsville, Pennsylvania, was the first possible place that travelers crossing the Alleghenies could reach the waters of the Ohio River and Mississippi River drainage basins. Most riverbanks were too steep for wagons, and on the convex side of a sweeping curve, Brownsville had several tributary streams cutting across the cliff face formed by the River's cut bank, which served to erode parts forming a ramp-like descent to the river shores. (Note: Most of the Monongahela Valley has comparatively steep banks, save for the comparatively shallow-sloped shelves which geophysical forces form on the inside sweep of large meander bends opposite the cut banksides. Consequently, an aerial overview up the Mon-valley will notice communities tend to alternate placements to either side of the Monongahela.) The opposite shore (West Brownsville also had several climbable slopes and the two banks were connected by a passable ford just upstream of the Brownsville Bridges built in support of the National Road.

The Cumberland Trail continued westward by climbing up several slopes and roughly 2.0 miles (3.2 km) from West Brownsville, the road reached a relatively flat area through Malden, land-linked the Ohio River ford at Wheeling, West Virginia to the river ford between the Brownsville's across the Monongahela River (where the mountainous terrain was behind one's wagon) through the shallow crossing south and upstream of riverboat building center of Brownsville and the flat shores of West Brownsville.

The wagon road was an emigrant trail, serving to convey settlers west to the new lands of the Northwest Territory and the Mississippi River basin. The Cumberland Pike began as a privately funded toll road, between Baltimore and Cumberland, Maryland, then gradually extended westwards as improvements could be made. The toll road never reached West of Brownsville, and the balance (eventually reaching Vandalia, Illinois) was built with Federal funds to support westward migration. The part from the Monongahela to the Ohio River crossing at Wheeling, West Virginia, in general, followed the path of the western leg of the long Amerindian trail known as Nemacolin's Path or "Chief Nemacolin's Trail," as had the Cumberland Pike through the Mountains.
