= Dunlap's Creek Bridge =

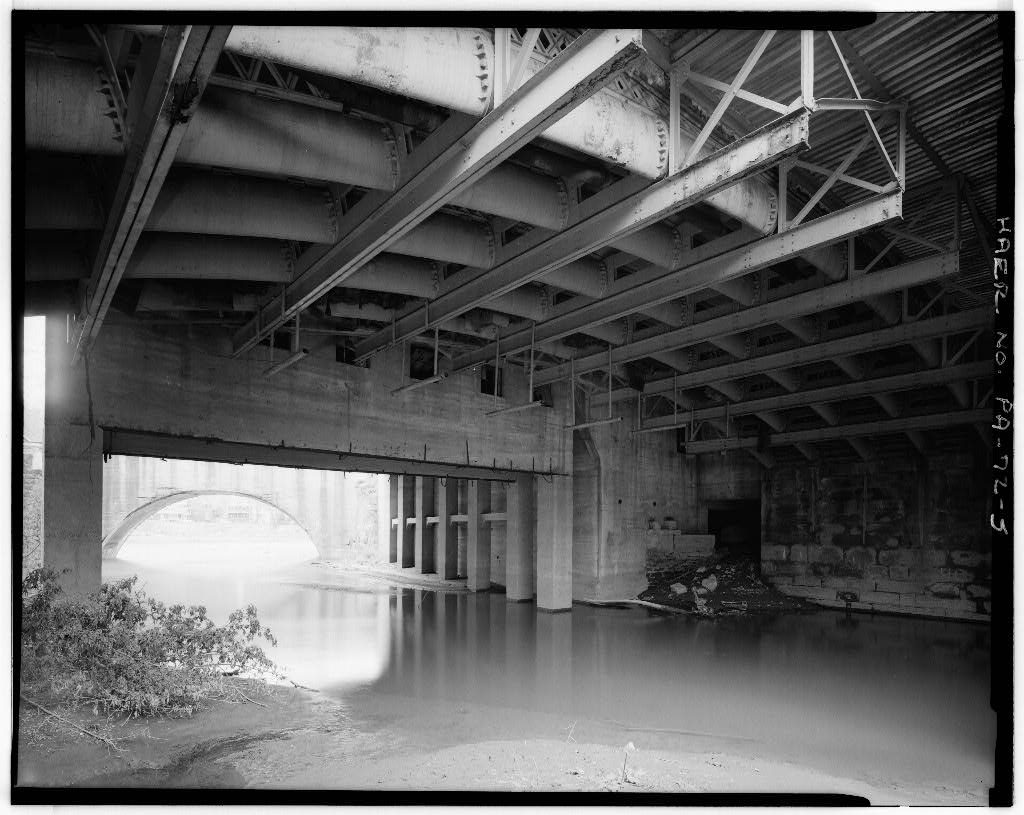
- Coordinates: 40°01′18″N 79°53′17″W
- Dunlap's Creek Bridge
- U.S. National Register of Historic Places
- Location within Pennsylvania Location within the United States
- Coordinates: 40°1′18″N 79°53′17″W
- NRHP reference No.: 78002398
- Added to NRHP: July 31, 1978
- Carries: National Road
- Crosses: Dunlap's Creek
- Locale: Brownsville, Pennsylvania

Characteristics
- Design: arch bridge
- Material: Cast iron
- Longest span: 24.4 metres (80 ft)
- No. of spans: 1

History
- Designer: Richard Delafield
- Construction start: 1836
- Construction end: 1839

Location
- Interactive map of Dunlap's Creek Bridge

Dunlap's Creek Bridge is the first arch bridge in the United States built of cast iron. It was designed by Richard Delafield and built by the United States Army Corps of Engineers. Constructed from 1836 to 1839 on the National Road in Brownsville, Pennsylvania, it remains in use today. It is listed on the National Register of Historic Places and is a National Historic Civil Engineering Landmark (1978). It is located in the Brownsville Commercial Historic District and supports Market Street, the local main thoroughfare. Due to the steep sides of the Monongahela River valley, there is only room for two short streets parallel to the river's shore and graded mild enough to be comfortable to walk before the terrain rises too steeply for business traffic.

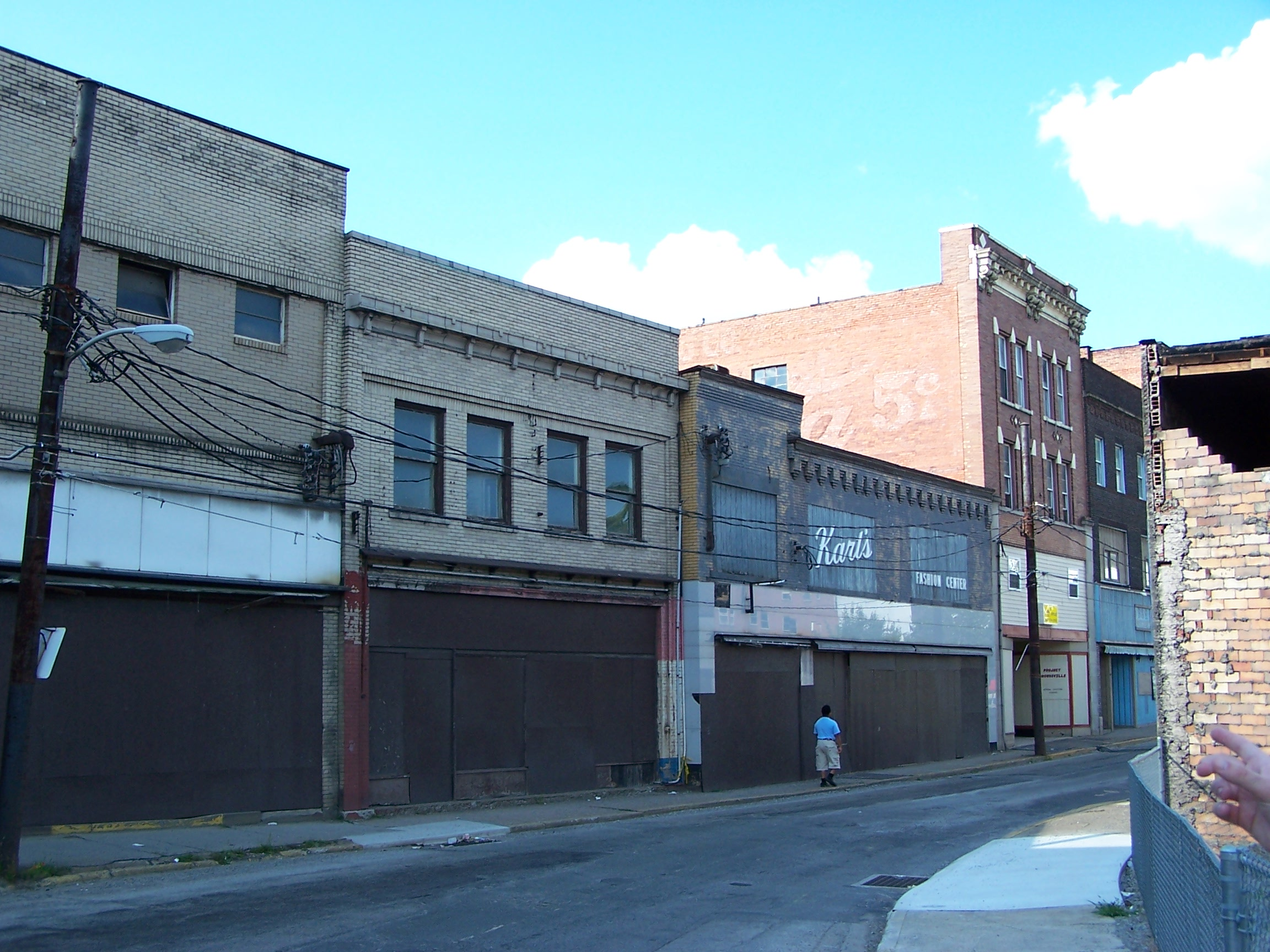
View of the once vibrant business strip, the Market Street historic district. Market Street's lowest stretch runs north of the ramp off the West Brownsville bridge for 3-4 blocks (about the scene here), whereafter it begins a steady climb to the end of the re-routed U.S. Route 40 bridge built at a much higher elevation near the site of the original settlement, the Tavern, Trading Post, and Inn near today's Bowman's Castle.

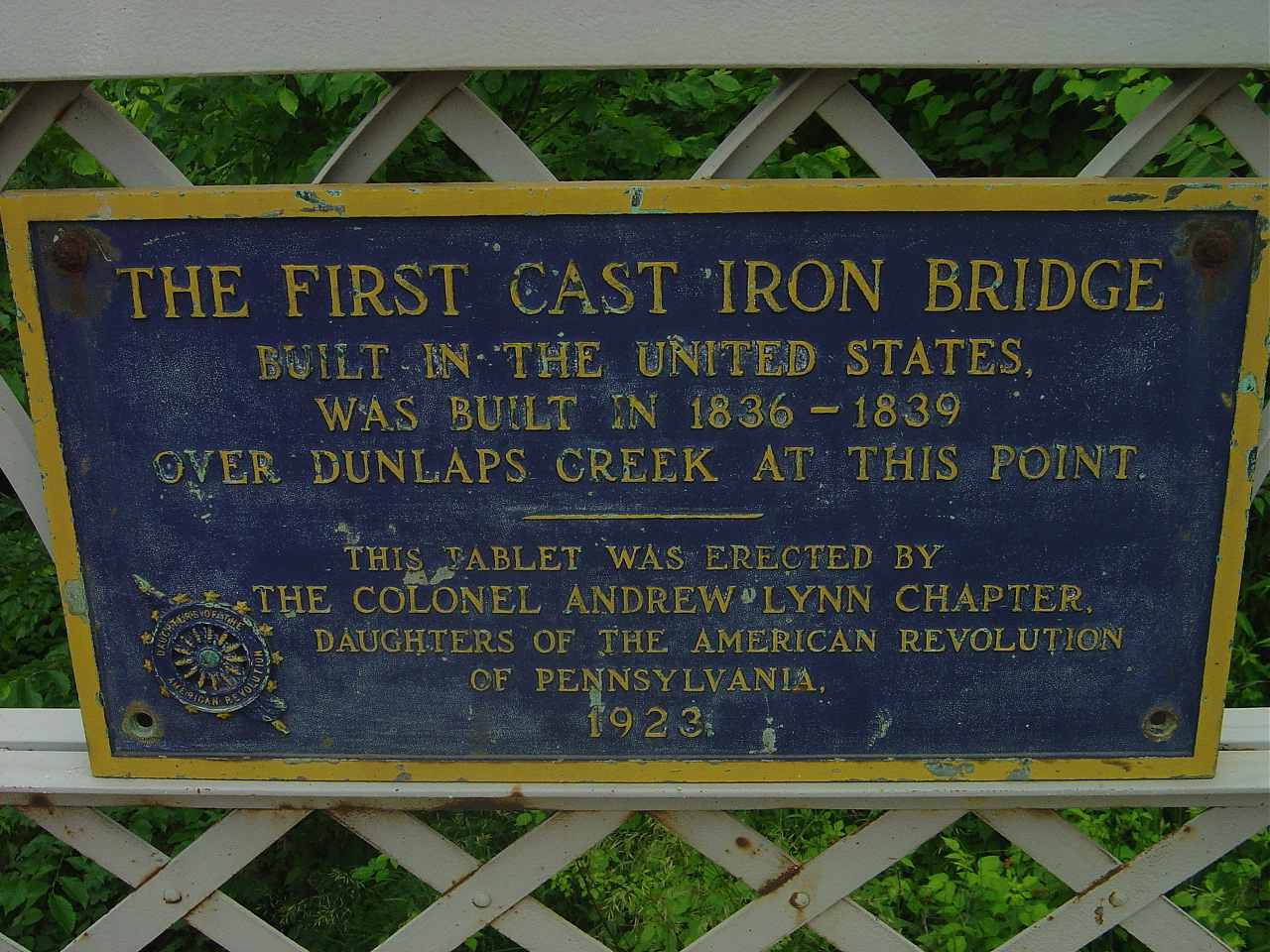
Plaque commemorating the first cast iron bridge built in the United States. This plaque is near or at the place the above picture of the Market Street was taken.

== History ==
There have been four structures on this site. The first two collapsed in 1808 and 1820. The third, a wood-framed structure, needed replacement by 1832.

This bridge is constructed using five parallel tubular ribs, each made of 9 elliptical segments to form the 80 feet (24 m) arch.

In 2025, the bridge was completely disassembled by the Pennsylvania Department of Transportation to rehabilitate the original cast iron structural components and reconstruct the road deck. Re-construction of the bridge began in September 2026 and is expected to be placed back into service by the end of 2026.

== See also ==
- List of bridges documented by the Historic American Engineering Record in Pennsylvania
- List of Registered Historic Places in Fayette County, Pennsylvania
- List of historic civil engineering landmarks
