= Thomas Novak =

Thomas Novak may refer to:

- Thomas Novak (engineer) (born 1952), American professor of mining engineering
- Tom Novak (American football) (1925–1998), American football player
- Tom Novak (professor), American professor of marketing
- Tommy Novak (born 1997), American ice hockey player

== See also ==
- Tihomir Novak (born 1986), Croatian futsal player
