= Thomas H. Thompson House =

Historic house in Pennsylvania, United States

- U.S. National Register of Historic Places
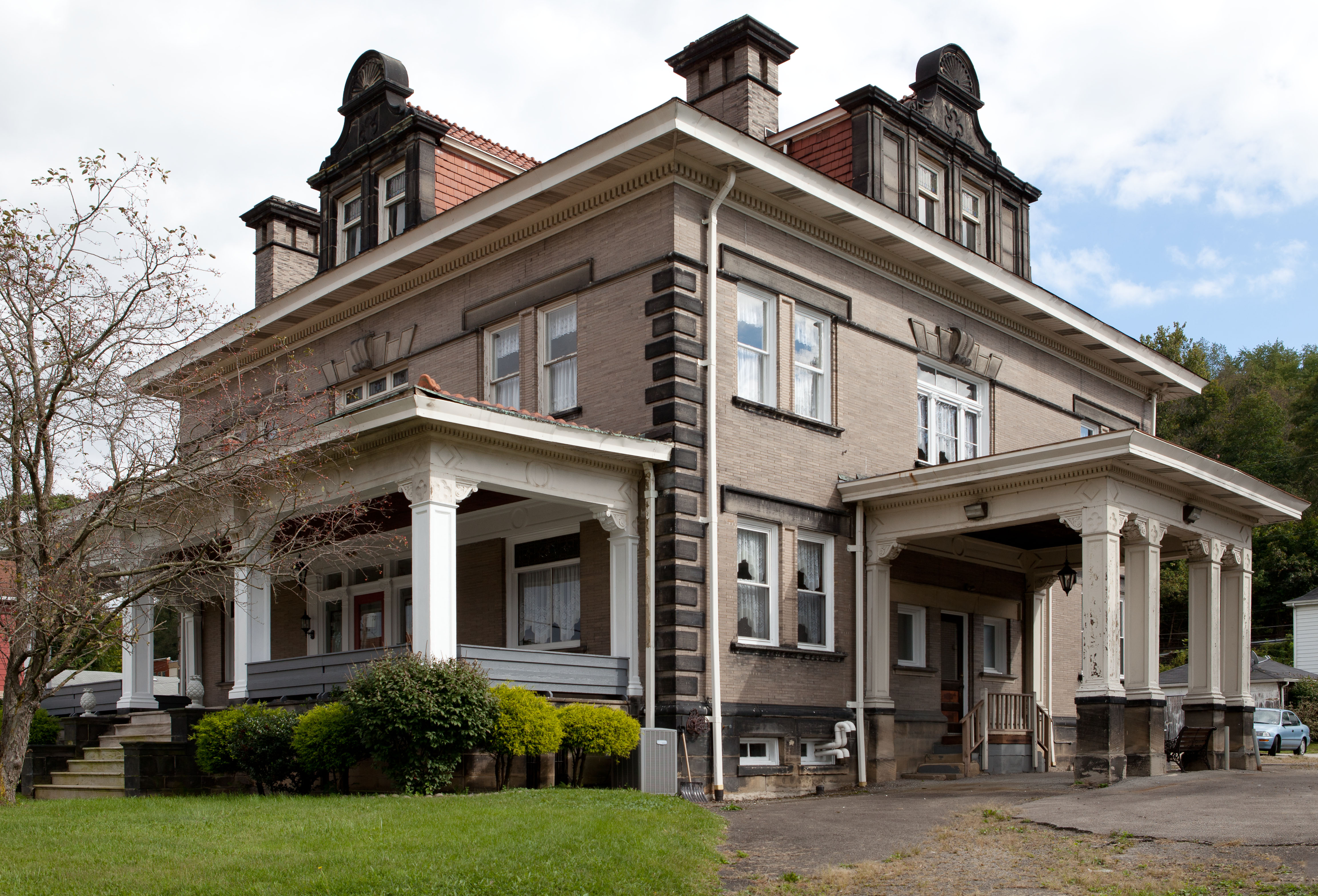

- Location within Pennsylvania Location within the United States
- Location: 815 Water St., Brownsville, Pennsylvania
- Coordinates: 40°0′38″N 79°53′47″W
- Area: less than one acre
- Built: 1906
- Architect: Estep, Harry Summers; Ramella, Sebastian P.
- Architectural style: Mission/spanish Revival, Colonial Revival
- NRHP reference No.: 95000128
- Added to NRHP: February 24, 1995

The Thomas H. Thompson House, also known as Wayside Manor, is an historic home that is located in Brownsville, Fayette County, Pennsylvania, United States.

It was added to the National Register of Historic Places in 1995.

== History and architectural features ==
Built in 1906, this historic structure is a 3 1/2-story brick dwelling with Spanish Colonial Revival-style design details. It has a hipped roof clad with red Spanish tile, dormers on three sides of the roof, a full-width front porch, and carved stone detailing. Also located on the property is a two-story, hipped roof carriage house built in 1917–1918.
