= Brownsville Commercial Historic District =

Historic district in Pennsylvania, United States

- U.S. National Register of Historic Places
- U.S. Historic district
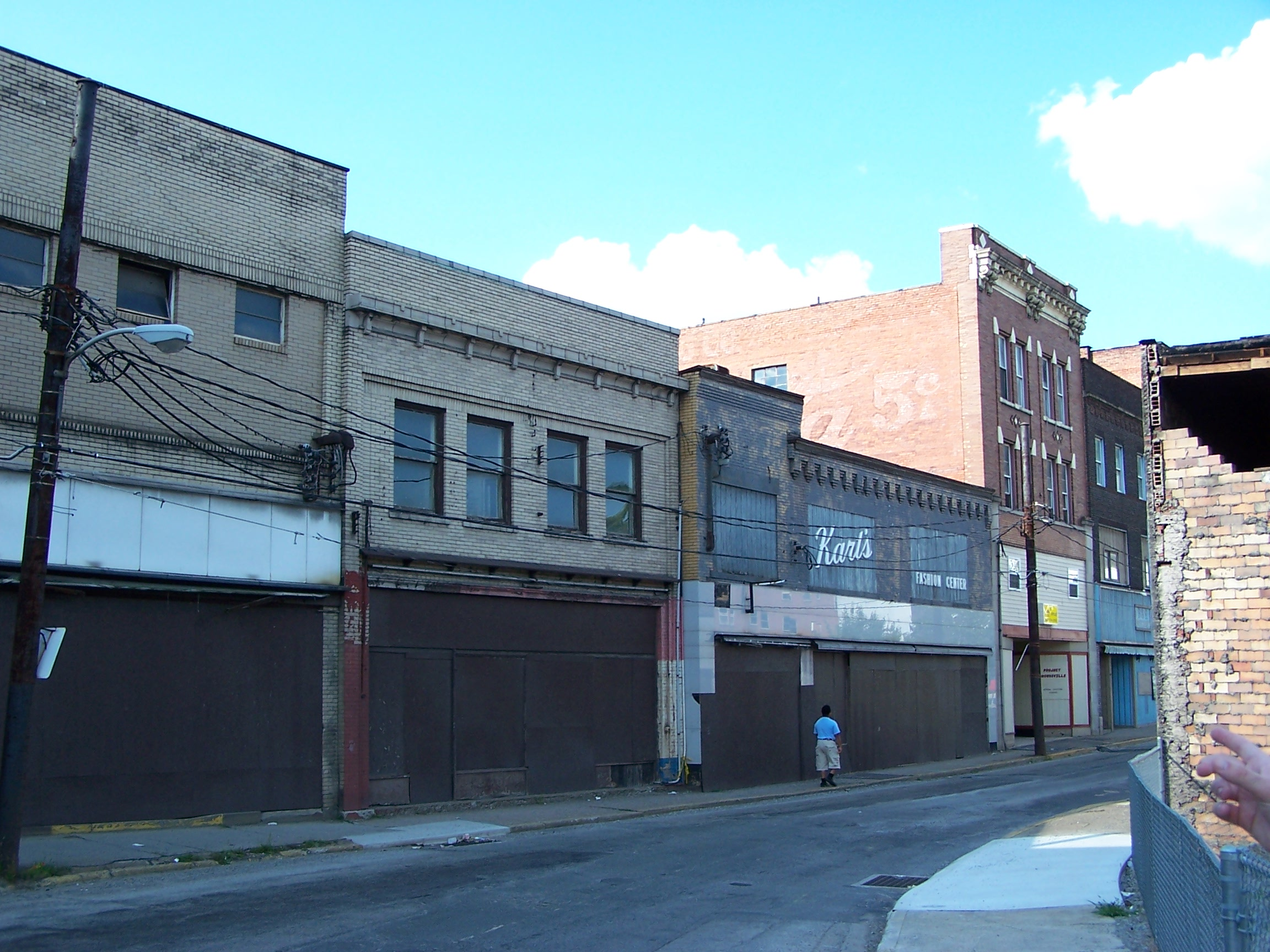
- Brownsville Commercial Historic District, May 2008

- Location within Pennsylvania Location within the United States
- Location: 105-128 Brownsville Ave. and 1-145 Market, 101-200 High, 2-6 Water, 100 Charles, 1 Seneca and 108 Bank Sts., Brownsville, Pennsylvania
- Coordinates: 40°01′17″N 79°53′13″W
- Area: 19 acres (7.7 ha)
- Architect: Multiple
- Architectural style: Classical Revival, Moderne, Italianate
- NRHP reference No.: 93000716
- Added to NRHP: August 2, 1993

Brownsville Commercial Historic District is a national historic district located adjacent to the Brownsville Northside Historic District at Brownsville, Fayette County, Pennsylvania. The district includes 55 contributing buildings and two contributing structures in the central business district of Brownsville. Most of the contributing buildings are three and four-story brick commercial buildings built between 1900 and 1930, with four buildings dated to the 19th century. The oldest building is the Flatiron Building (c. 1835). Other notable buildings include the International Order of Odd Fellows Building (1876), Monongahela National Bank (1902), Second National Bank (1916), Snowdon Building (1907), Union Station (1928), Crawford Building (1908), and Borough Building (1940). The contributing structures are the separately listed Dunlap's Creek Bridge and a stone railroad tunnel (1903).

It was added to the National Register of Historic Places in 1993.
