= Blainsburg, Pennsylvania =

Unincorporated community in Pennsylvania, US

Coordinates: 40°01′56″N 79°52′51″W

- unincorporated area
- Blainsburg, Pennsylvania
- Nickname: California-3
- Interactive map of Blainsburg, Pennsylvania
- Country: United States
- State: Pennsylvania
- County: Washington
- Established: 1800s

Government Blainsburg is a Annex of West Brownsville
  - Type: Annex of West Brownsville
- Elevation Elevation reported at point where GoogleEarth locates search to "Blainsburg, West Brownsville, PA: 957 ft (292 m)
- Time zone: UTC-5 (Eastern (EST))
  - Summer (DST): UTC-4 (EDT)
- Postal code: 15417
- Area code: 724

Blainsburg is an unincorporated community in Washington County, Pennsylvania, United States. Blainsburg is an outlier community of West Brownsville, Pennsylvania – a hamlet-sized neighborhood with more housing acreage than West Brownsville proper. Named after James G. Blaine, Blainsburg is part of the California Area School District. West Brownsville students attend Brownsville Area School District in Fayette County. The bedroom community is situated on the bluff above and slightly north-northwest of West Brownsville on the river bottom below. Blainsburg is located alongside and above the PA Route 88 climb from the W. Brownsville river flats (locally known as Blainsburg Hill Road) which bends right, entering a shelf where it connects with the northwest streets of Blainsburg before taking a second ascent (now becoming California Road) towards California. The parent and child communities are on the inside curve of a great meander in the Monongahela River in Southwestern Pennsylvania creating a degraded cut bank turned ramp and terrace on the opposite shore where Brownsville is situated. Blainsburg is often misspelled with an "E" in it, to match the spelling of its namesake, James G. Blaine. Blainsburg as of official records was founded in 1906 and is still spelled without the "E".

== Geography ==
The majority of elevations in (very flat) West Brownsville average 770–780 feet (230–240 m), while only a short distance away, the elevations in the larger street grid of Blainsburg run from 930–1,040 feet (280–320 m). Measured at Pittsburgh Rd. Jct. with 5th Avenue, the elevation in Blainsburg is 940 feet (290 m), nearly 170 feet (52 m) above the junction of Main St. and Pittsburgh Rd. in West Brownsville. The GoogleEarth ruler tool reports the distance between the two points is 980 feet (300 m)—a gradient of 18.57%.

Pennsylvania Route 88 climbs roughly parallel (starting from farther south in West Brownsville and rises at a slower rate, so the higher side of Blainsburg is atop a bluff lining and overlooking the moderated climb of the highway.) In addition, Blainsburg over looks a rail yard and an railroad bridge built by the Monongahela Railroad tying the railroad wye, sidings, and small yard in Brownsville along Albany Road with the much larger yard in West Brownsville.
