= Brownsville Bridge =

Bridge in United States of America

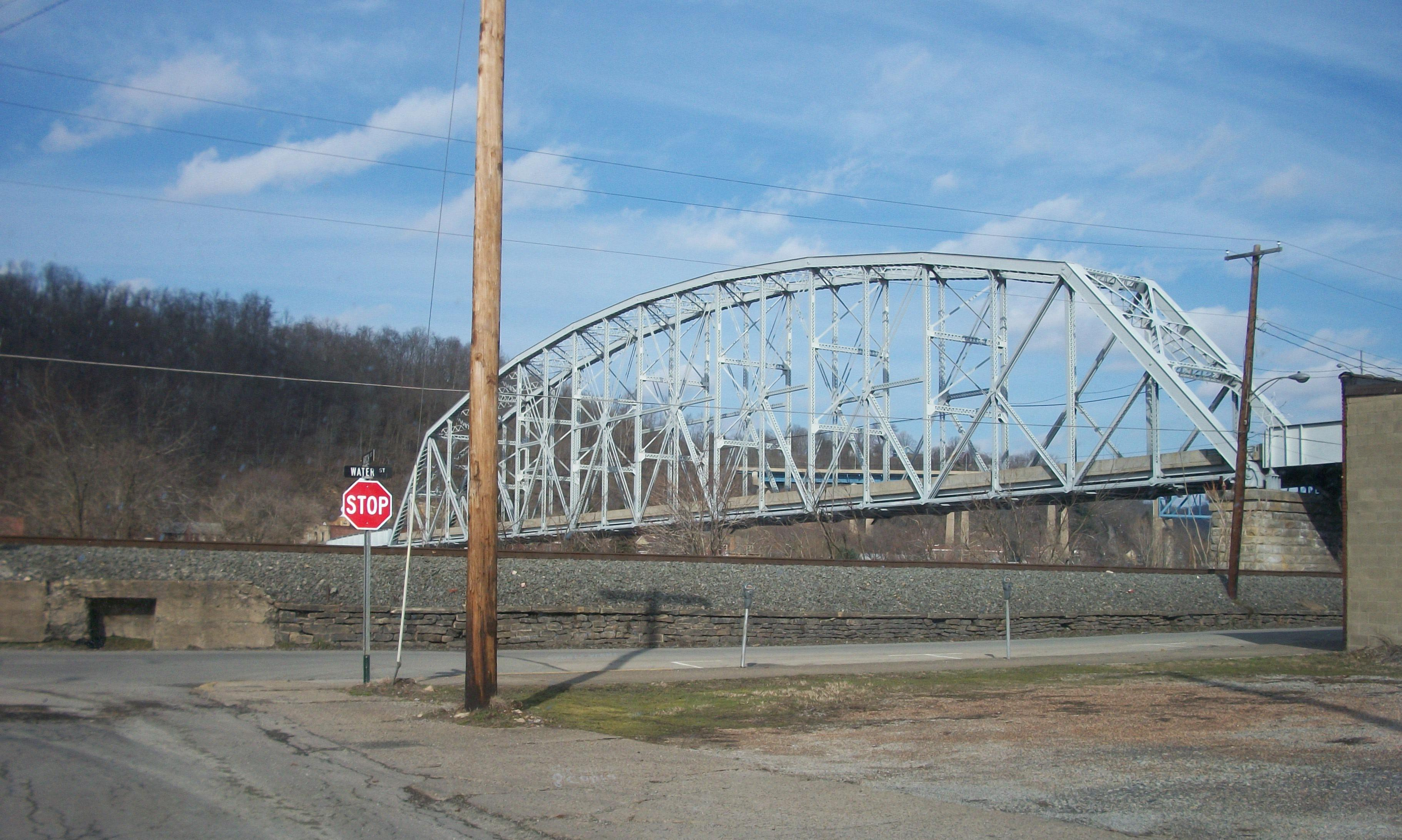
- Coordinates: 40°1′21″N 79°53′24″W
- Carries: SR 4025
- Crosses: Monongahela River near a ford
- Locale: Brownsville, Pennsylvania and West Brownsville, Pennsylvania
- Other name(s): Intercounty Bridge; West Brownsville Bridge

Characteristics
- Design: Truss bridge
- Total length: 945 feet (288 m)
- Width: 22.6 feet (6.9 m)
- Longest span: 520 feet (160 m)
- Clearance above: 20 feet (6.1 m)

History
- Opened: 1914
- Brownsville Bridge, Intercounty Bridge, West Brownsville Bridge
- U.S. National Register of Historic Places
- Washington County History & Landmarks Foundation Landmark
- Location within Pennsylvania Location within the United States
- Location: LR 268 over Monongahela River, West Brownsville, Pennsylvania
- Area: less than one acre
- Built: 1913
- Architect: Herman & Armstrong; Ft. Pitt Bridge Works
- Architectural style: Pennsylvania Petit truss
- MPS: Highway Bridges Owned by the Commonwealth of Pennsylvania, Department of Transportation TR
- NRHP reference No.: 88000834
- Added to NRHP: June 22, 1988

Location
- Interactive map of Brownsville Bridge

The Brownsville Bridge, also known as the Intercounty Bridge and the West Brownsville Bridge (most often heard in the high counties east of the river), is a truss bridge that carries vehicular traffic across the Monongahela River between Brownsville, Pennsylvania and West Brownsville, Pennsylvania. Since the opening of the Lane Bane Bridge and highway project to carry much of the intercounty through traffic away from the main streets of downtown Brownsville in the early 1960s, another commonly heard name is Old Brownsville Bridge for the four high level viaduct.

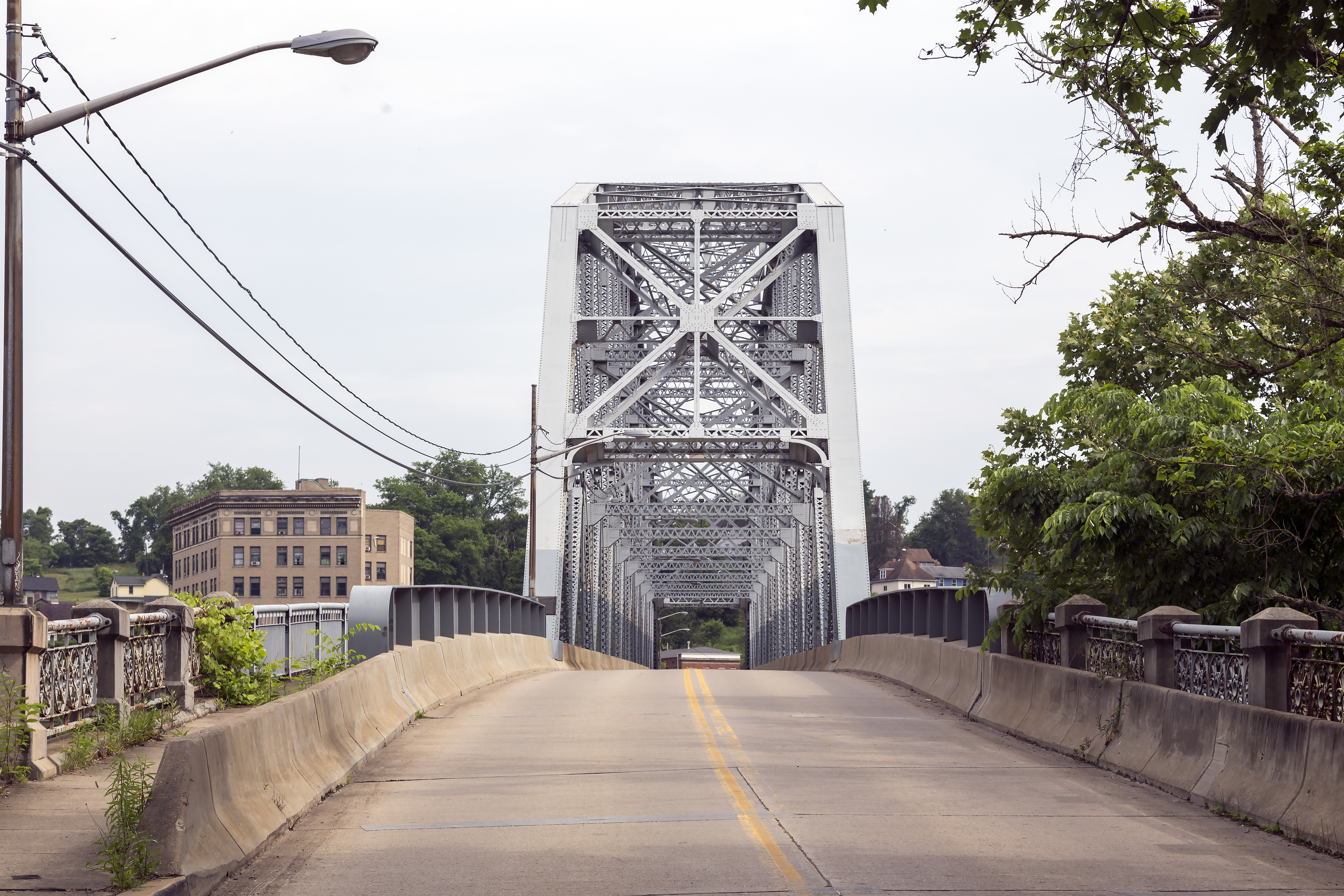
Approaching the Brownsville-West Brownsville Bridge from the flat shelf of the non-cut bank landforms of West Brownsville.

The West Brownsville-Brownsville Bridge was completed in 1914 to replace an 1831 wooden structure that was ill-suited for the vehicular traffic that the National Road was beginning to carry, as motorized vehicle traffic began replacing animal powered transportation technologies. The famous federal route has crossed the river at this point since its inception, with ferry service in the early nineteenth century. In 1960, the Lane Bane Bridge was constructed just downstream and U.S. Route 40 was moved to the new high-level structure. Currently, the route serves local traffic and is meant to tie together the interconnected towns on each bank.

It is designated as a historic bridge by the Washington County History & Landmarks Foundation.

== See also ==
- List of bridges documented by the Historic American Engineering Record in Pennsylvania
- List of crossings of the Monongahela River
