= Flatiron Building (Brownsville, Pennsylvania) =

- U.S. Historic district – Contributing property
- Location within Pennsylvania Location within the United States
- Location: 69 Market St., Brownsville, Pennsylvania
- Coordinates: 40.02266°N 79.88555°W
- Built: c.1835
- Part of: Brownsville Commercial Historic District (ID93000716)
- Designated CP: August 2, 1993

The Flatiron Building in Brownsville, Pennsylvania is located in the Brownsville Commercial Historic District. The building is owned and was restored by the Brownsville Area Revitalization Corporation.

== Museums ==
The Flatiron Building Heritage Center, located within the building at 69 Market Street, holds artifacts from Brownsville's heyday, as well as displays about the community's important coal and coke heritage.

The building is also home to the Frank L. Melega Art Museum that features the permanent collection of Frank L. Melega, a regional painter, sculptor and commercial artist whose works reflect the everyday life of a coal miner. The museum also features changing exhibits of local contemporary art.
