= Thomas Novak (engineer) =

American engineer

Thomas Novak, PhD, PE (born September 27, 1952, in Brownsville, Pennsylvania) is the Alliance Coal Academic Chair of Mining Engineering at the University of Kentucky, appointed in 2010. Previously, he held appointments at the National Institute for Occupational Safety and Health, Virginia Tech, the University of Alabama and Pennsylvania State University. He received his PhD in mining engineering from the Pennsylvania State University in 1984. His research focuses on techniques to assess and improve mine safety and ventilation. His most recognized contributions to the field have been in understanding how electrical hazards such as lightning can trigger explosions in underground mines. This work has helped to explain a number of mine-related catastrophes in the last 30 years and has served to significantly improve mine safety.

He is a Fellow of the Institute of Electrical and Electronics Engineers (IEEE).
