= Brownsville, Pennsylvania =

Borough in Pennsylvania, US

- Borough
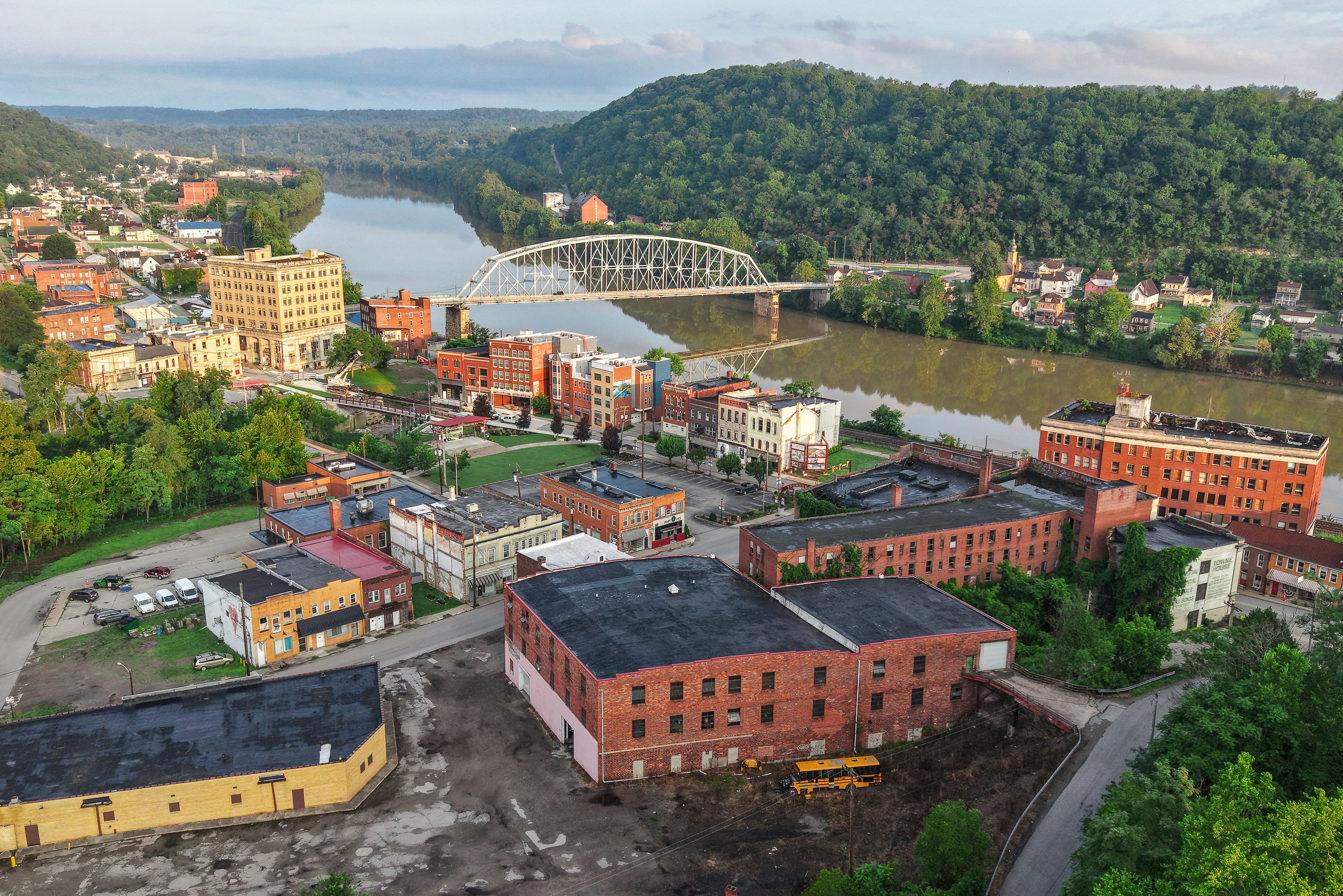
- Aerial view of Brownsville in 2026
- Etymology: Thomas Brown
- Location of Brownsville in Fayette County, Pennsylvania.

- Location of Brownsville in Pennsylvania
- Coordinates: 40°1′12″N 79°53′22″W
- Country: United States
- State: Pennsylvania
- County: Fayette
- Established: 1785

Government
  - Mayor: Ross H Swords Jr.

Area
  - Total: 1.09 sq mi (2.83 km^{2})
  - Land: 0.98 sq mi (2.53 km^{2})
  - Water: 0.11 sq mi (0.29 km^{2})

Population (2020)
  - Total: 2,185
  - Density: 2,235/sq mi (863.1/km^{2})
- Time zone: UTC-4 (EST)
  - Summer (DST): UTC-5 (EDT)
- ZIP code: 15417
- Area code: 724
- FIPS code: 42-051-09432
- GNIS feature ID: 1214026
- Website: brownsvilleborough.com

Brownsville is a borough in Fayette County, Pennsylvania, United States, first settled in 1785 as the site of a trading post a few years after the defeat of the Iroquois enabled a resumption of westward migration after the American Revolutionary War. The trading post soon became a tavern and inn and was receiving emigrants heading west, as it was located above the cut bank overlooking the first ford that could be reached to those descending from the Allegheny Mountains. (Note: In Somerset County, near Fort Necessity, traffic through the Cumberland Narrows pass could take a northwards jog and descend along the Youghiogheny River from near Ohiopyle or descend by a more direct route through the area that later became the Fayette County seat, Uniontown, and descend near the Mound Builders culture's artifacts named as Redstone Old Fort along Nemacolin's Trail.) Brownsville is located 40 miles (64 km) south of Pittsburgh along the east bank of the Monongahela River.

According to the United States Census Bureau, the borough of Brownsville has a total area of 1.1 square miles (2.8 km^{2}), of which 0.97 square miles (2.5 km^{2}) is land and 0.1 square miles (0.3 km^{2}), or 10.47%, is water—most of which is the Fayette County half of the Monongahela River between the community and the flatter lands of West Brownsville on the opposite shore in Washington County. As a community, the town is the central population center for a number of outlying hamlets geographically tied to the town for the same reasons they were founded nearby: western Pennsylvania has far more hills and steep slopes than flats or gentle sloping terrains suitable for settlement. This keeps Brownsville at the nexus of the transportation infrastructure which grew up during its history. While no longer a passenger depot, Brownsville and West Brownsville share an important railway bridge, creating a balloon loop that allows the turning of complete coal trains. The limited-access toll road Pennsylvania Route 43 connects the town to strategic points and southern Pittsburgh at Clairton. Pennsylvania Route 88, (Note: Via West Brownsville and the Brownsville Bridge.) hugging the river, connects to towns up and down the Monongahela Valley. The historic National Road (now U.S. Route 40) reached East Saint Louis, Illinois, and connected the town to the immigrants arriving in the port of Baltimore traveling west on the Cumberland Turnpike and the National Road.

From its founding, well into the 19th century, as the first reachable population center west of the Alleghenies barrier range on the Mississippi watershed, the borough quickly grew into an industrial center, market town, transportation hub, outfitting center, and riverboat-building powerhouse. As a trading post, it was a gateway destination for emigrants heading west to the Ohio Country and the new United States' Northwest Territory, and later for travelers heading westwards on the various Emigrant Trails both to the Near West and later the Far West. As an outfitting center, the borough provided the markets for the small-scale industries in the surrounding counties, as well as for Maryland shipping goods over the pass by mule train via the Cumberland Narrows toll route.

Brownsville became a major center for building steamboats through the 19th century, producing 3,000 boats by 1888.

The borough developed in the late 19th century as a railroad yard and coking center, with other industries related to the rise of steel in the Pittsburgh area. It reached a peak of population of more than 8,000 in 1940. Postwar development took place in suburbs, as was typical of the time. The restructuring of the railroad and steel industries caused a severe loss of jobs and population in Brownsville, beginning in the 1970s. As of the 2020 census, Brownsville had a population of 2,185.

== History ==
In pre-Columbian times, the right bank of the Monongahela River held several mounds where iron-rich red stone predominated, (Note: Due to the sparse availability of building space in Brownsville during its boom days, 1800–1870, these Mound Builders' constructs were demolished and only a little of them were available for examination by modern archaeologists.) now believed to have been constructed by a branch of the Mound Builders cultures, but believed by colonials to have been forts. This led to the area near the river crossing being called Redstone Old Fort in various colonial government records and later Fort Burd when an arms cache was built there. By the time the region first became known to Dutch colonists and traders and the French in the 1640s, the lands were largely unoccupied, (Note: The Dutch and Swedish fur traders did not leave historical documents, so accounts are decidedly second- and third-hand reports, but the rich lands of West Virginia, Western Pennsylvania, and Ohio—later called the Ohio Country—were all reported as lacking population and Iroquois or Iroquoian hunting lands. Three Iroquoian military super-powers each had access to the region before the 1670s: the Erie peoples, the Susquehannock peoples, and the Confederacy of the Iroquois, whereafter the Iroquois emerged decimated, but atop the heap of survivors of the Beaver Wars as the Kingdom of England's colonies took over control of most of the Eastern seaboard after the 1660s. Settlements even through the lower Susquehanna River valley and Western Maryland were inhibited by the Iroquois well into the 1750s and those of the Province of Virginia, Connecticut, and Pennsylvania west of the Alleghenies were "extremely chancy" until after the American Revolution. After the formation of the United States, the settlement by the government of conflicting colonial land claims and the establishment of Western Pennsylvania's and Virginia's western borders and the Northwest Territory on July 13, 1787, then served to spur western settlement from a trickle into a flood of emigrants.) but under the management of one tribe or shared by several groups of Iroquoian peoples, likely the Erie people or Wenro people (Note: French Jesuit missionaries and traders were required to report annually on events in the new world, so that their chronicles describe Western Pennsylvania and Eastern Ohio as essentially vacant, and the Wenro small in numbers, which leads to speculation that the Wenro had recently lost a big internecine war, and had been driven into the few towns between present-day Buffalo and Rochester, New York. The Wenro tribes were sandwiched between the Iroquois' and Seneca people's lands and those of the Erie people, both thought to be militarily powerful in the mid-17th century.) and possibly shared with the Seneca, the Shawnee people and the Susquehannocks. With all the rivers and streams tributary to the Monongahela, Youghiogheny, and Allegheny Rivers, there is little known about the region's precise role in the Beaver Wars of the 17th century, but when French, Dutch and Swedish fur traders penetrated to the Greater Ohio Basin in the 1640s and 1650s, the one thing that seemed clear to those observers was that the lands later termed the Ohio Country seemed empty and unpopulated.

In the 17th century, several provincial Virginians and Marylanders confirmed the emptiness of the region. Before the 1750s, the area was "colonized" by weakened remnant tribes such as the Delaware and the few Erie and the Susquehannock survivors that the Iroquois allowed to move there as tributary peoples (climbing the gaps of the Allegheny). These migrations occurred over the 70 to 80 years before the French and Indian War in the 1750s, where today's historians usually report the lands were long held as "hunting territories" (Note: as "hunting territories" of the powerful Iroquois, likely held as conquest prizes for kicking off then prevailing the many decades of the Beaver Wars, when tribe after tribe fell to other Native Americans in vicious territorial wars historians tell us, were like nothing the Indians normally practiced.) of the powerful Five Nations of the Iroquois Confederacy. (Note: The Erie had preemptively attacked the Iroquois c. 1653, but lost by 1657, at which time the Iroquois were known to claim lands as far south as the right bank of the Ohio opposite Western Kentucky shorelines. In the early 1950s, the closest Indian towns were Mingo communities both along the Youghiogheny to the Northeast and near Mingo Creek above present-day Donora, Pennsylvania. Shawnee and Seneca were also living in the wider area, the former a French ally, and the latter as Iroquois, the blood enemies of the French along with their Mingo relatives. Susquehannocks suffered a devastating succession of plagues c. 1671, leaving the Iroquois take them over as well as the Delaware groups tributary to the once mighty Susquehannocks.) During the Revolution, the Iroquois were divided whether to back the colonies or the mother country, and mostly did neither, attempting to stay neutral. Nonetheless, in 1778, agitated by British officers lobbying for frontier attacks, mixed parties of Tories (Loyalists) and Iroquois committed atrocities in 1778, so Washington sent the Sullivan Expedition in 1779, which broke the power of the Iroquois and reopened the Ohio Country to homesteader settlement. As a river crossing, the closest to the pass that reached the Monongahela, the town saw many settlers passing by.

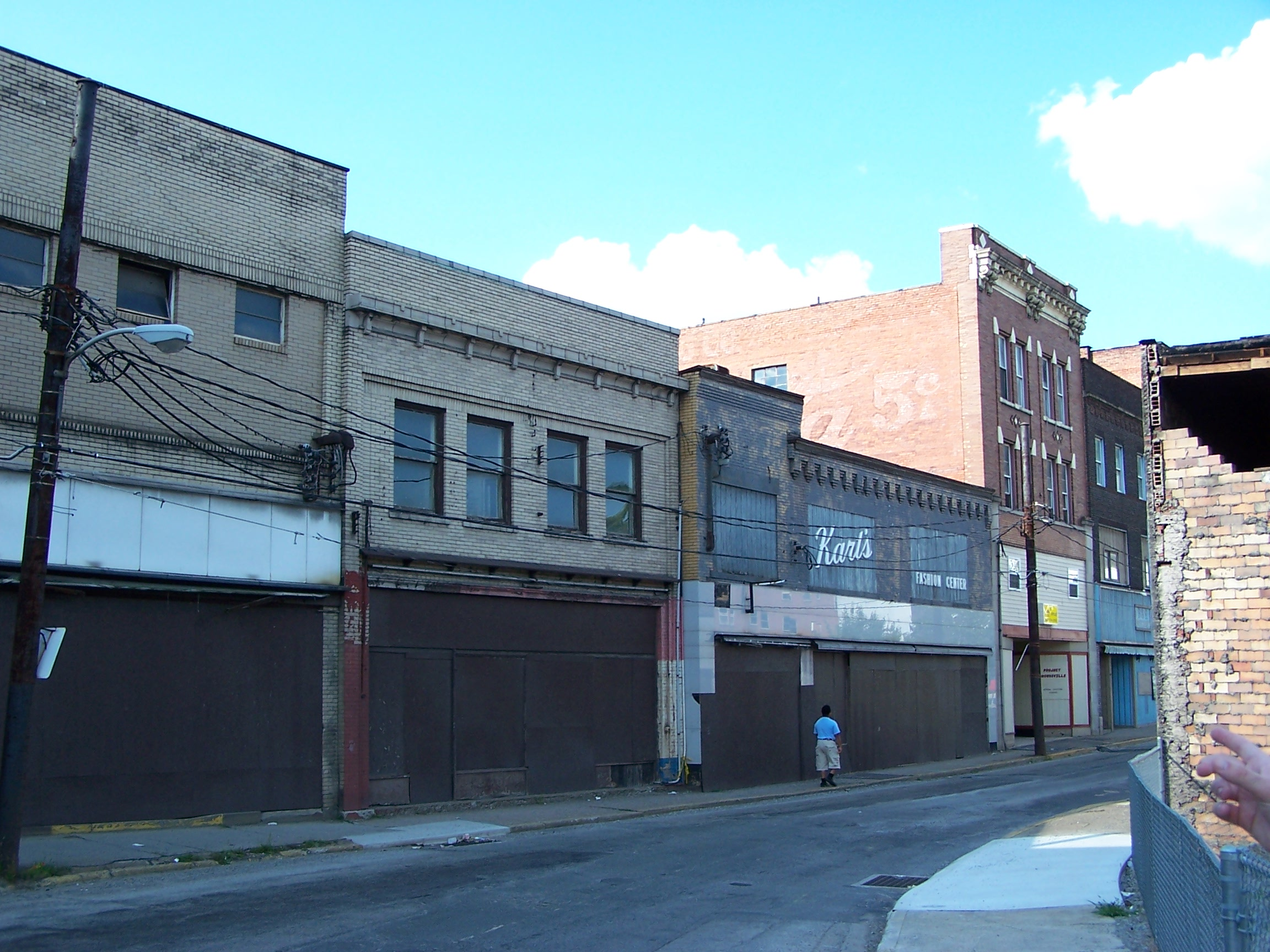
View of Market Street historic district

Because colonial settlers believed that the earthwork mounds were a prehistoric fortification, they called the settlement Redstone Old Fort; later in the 1760s and 1770s, it became known as "Redstone Fort" or "Fort Burd", named after the officer who commanded the British fort constructed in 1759. The fort was constructed during the French and Indian War on the bluff above the river near a prehistoric earthwork mound that was also the site of historic Native American burial grounds.

In 1774, a force from the Colony of Virginia garrisoned and occupied the stockade during Lord Dunmore's War against the Mingo and Shawnee peoples. It commanded the important strategic river ford of Nemacolin's Trail, the western path to the summit; this was later improved and called "Burd's Road". It was an alternative route down to the Monongahela River valley from Braddock's Road, which George Washington helped to build. Washington came to own vast portions of the lands on the west bank of the Monongahela; the Pennsylvania legislature named Washington County after him.

Entrepreneur Thomas Brown acquired the western lands in what became Fayette County, Pennsylvania, around the end of the American Revolution. He realized the opening of the pass through the Cumberland Narrows and the end of the war made the land at the western tip of Fayette County a natural springboard for settlers traveling to points west, such as Kentucky, Tennessee and Ohio. Many travelers used the Ohio River and its tributary, the Monongahela. Eventually the settlement became known as "Brownsville" after him. In the 1780s, Jacob Bowman bought the land on which he built Nemacolin Castle; he had a trading post and provided services and supplies to emigrant settlers.

Redstone Old Fort is mentioned in C. M. Ewing's The Causes of that so called Whiskey Insurrection of 1794 (1930) as the site of a July 27, 1791, meeting in "Opposition to the Whiskey Excise Tax," during the Whiskey Rebellion. It was the first meeting of that illegal frontier insurrection.

Brownsville was positioned at the western end of the primitive road network (Braddock's Road to Burd's Road via the Cumberland Narrows pass) that eventually became chartered as the Cumberland toll road, then the National Pike (the federal government's first ever road project), and later present-day U.S. Route 40, one of the original federal highways.

As an embarkation point for travelers to the west, Redstone/Brownsville, blessed by several nearby wide and deep river tributaries that could support building slips, soon became a 19th-century center for the construction of riverine watercraft, initially keelboats and flatboats, but later steamboats large and small. The entire region sprouted small industries using local coal and iron deposits, selling iron fittings and products to outfitting settlers about to embark on the river. After 1845, its boats were used even by those intending to later take the Santa Fe Trail or Oregon Trail, as floating on a poleboat by river to St. Louis or other ports on the Mississippi River was generally safer, easier and far faster than overland travel of the time. (Note: According to the book The Delaware and Lehigh Canals, the leg from Philadelphia to Pittsburgh used to take just about a month by wagon or half that on horseback. With the construction of the Pennsylvania Canal System and the Allegheny Portage Railroad in the early 1830s, a traveler willing to stay on and sleep aboard the mule-towed barges could make the same trip in just four days.)

A large flatboat-building industry developed at Brownsville, exploiting the flats across the river in present-day West Brownsville to erect building slips. This was followed by its rapid entry into the building of steamboats: local craftsmen built the Enterprise in 1814, the first steamboat powerful enough to travel down the Mississippi River to New Orleans and back. Earlier boats did not have enough power to go upstream against the river's current. Brownsville developed as an early center of the steamboat-building industry in the 19th century. The Monongahela converges with the Ohio River at Pittsburgh and allowed for quick traveling to the western frontier. From 1811 to 1888, boatyards produced more than 3,000 steamboats. Steamboats were gradually supplanted in the passenger-carrying trade after the American Civil War as the construction of railroad networks surged, but concurrently grew important locally on the Ohio River and tributaries as tugs delivering bargeloads of minerals to the burgeoning steel industries growing up along the watershed from the 1850s. Steamboat propulsion would not be replaced by diesel-powered commercial tugs until the technology matured in the mid-20th century.

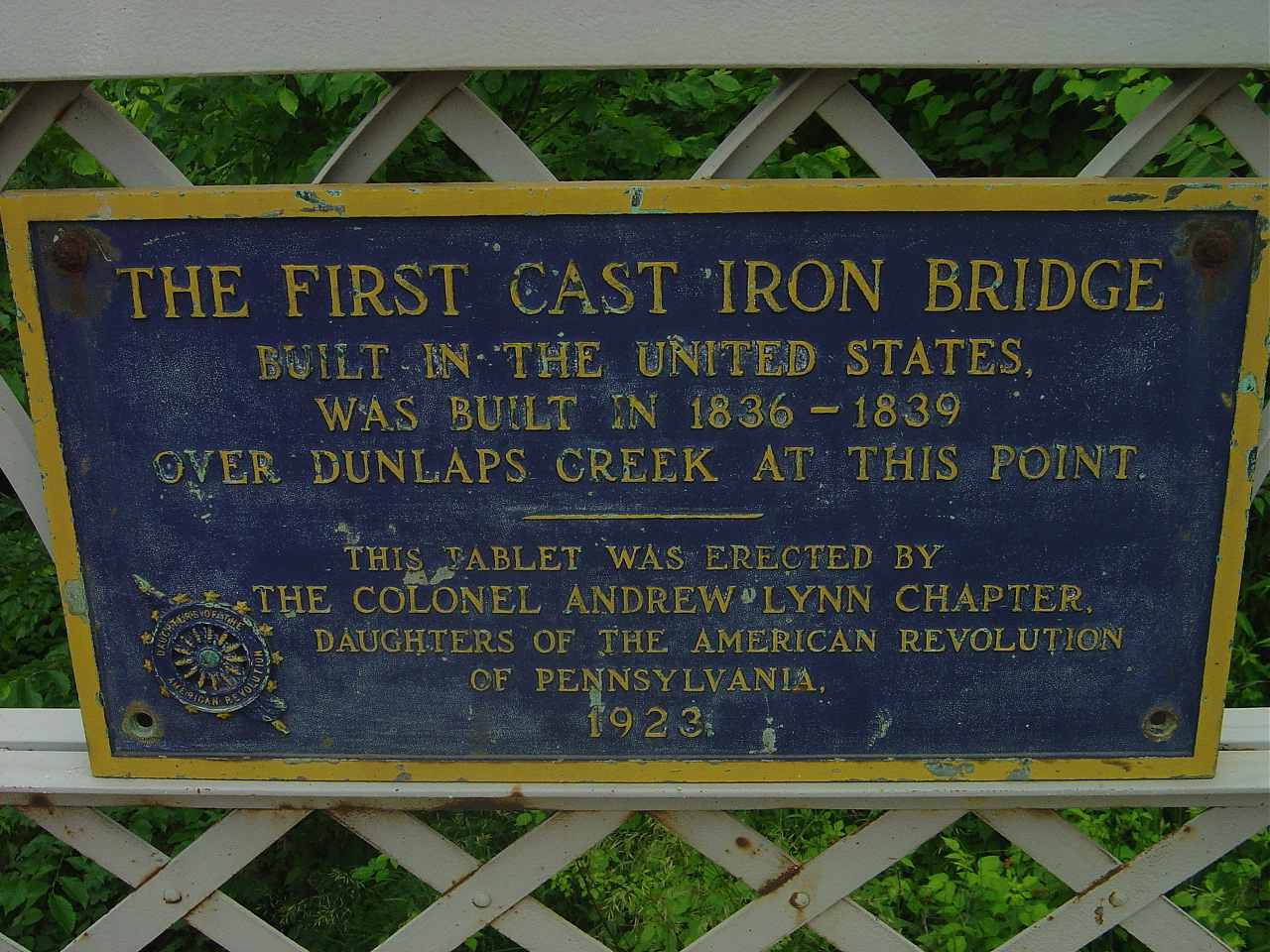
Plaque commemorating the first cast iron bridge built in the United States

The first all–cast iron arch bridge constructed in the United States was built in Brownsville to carry the National Pike (at the time a wagon road) across Dunlap's Creek. See Dunlap's Creek Bridge. As of 2023, the bridge is still in use.

After the 1853 completion of the Baltimore and Ohio Railroad to the Ohio, outfitting emigrant wagon trains in Brownsville declined in importance.

Yet the rise of the steel industry in the Pittsburgh area led Brownsville to develop as a railroad yard and coking center, generally integrated into other towns within the valley, so Brownsville and West Brownsville were tied to regional operations. While no one yard had space enough to be large, each township along the river shared resources and functioned as an elongated yard system. With its new role as railroad center and coking center together with the decline of outfitting, the town gradually lost its diverse mix of businesses, but, nonetheless, generally prospered during the early 20th century through the 1960s. Brownsville tightened its belt during the Great Depression, but the local economy resumed growth with the increased demand for steel during and after World War II, when many infrastructure projects improved and rerouted U.S. Route 40 over the new high-level Lane Bane Bridge, clearing up a perennial traffic congestion problem.

In 1940, 8,015 people lived in Brownsville. Its postwar growth led to the development of cross-county-line suburbs such as Malden, Lowhill, and Denbeau Heights (Denbow Heights), which were mainly bedroom communities within commuting distance. After the OPEC oil embargo of 1973–1974 triggered a recession, together with the restructuring of the steel industry and loss of industrial jobs, Brownsville suffered a severe decline, along with much of the Rust Belt. Generally, the region has declined in population and vitality ever since.

By 2000, the population was 2,804, as younger people had moved away to areas with more jobs. As of 2011, Brownsville has a handful of buildings that are condemned or boarded up. Abandoned buildings include the Union Station of the railroad, several banks, and other businesses. The sidewalks around the town are still intact and usable.

Brownsville attracted major entertainers in the early postwar years who also were performing in nearby Pittsburgh. According to Mike Evans in his book Ray Charles: The Birth of Soul (2007), the singer developed his hit "What'd I Say" as part of an after-show jam in Brownsville in December 1958.

== Culture ==
In 2019, Brownsville served as the primary filming location for the coming-of-age comedy-drama web television series I Am Not Okay with This, which became available on Netflix in 2020.

== Geography ==
Brownsville is located at 40°1′12″N 79°53′22″W (40.020026, −79.889536), situated on the east (convex) side of a broad sweeping westward bend in the northerly flowing Monongahela River on the northwestern edge of Fayette County. The river's action eroded the steep-sided sandstone hills, creating shelf-like benches and connecting sloped terrain that gave the borough lowland areas adjacent to or otherwise accessible to the river shores. Much of the borough's residential buildings are built above the elevation of the business district.

The opposite river shore of Washington County is, uncharacteristically for the region, shaped even lower to the water surface and is generally flatter. A small hamlet called West Brownsville developed on the western shore, with a current population of 992. Historically the area was a natural river crossing, and it was the site of development of a ferry, boat building and a bridge to carry roads. When the nascent United States government appropriated funds for its first road building project, in 1811 Brownsville was chosen as an early intermediate target destination along the new National Road. Until a bridge was built across the river, Brownsville was the western terminus.

Redstone Creek is a local tributary stream of the Monongahela River, entering just north of Brownsville. Its color came from the ferrous sandstone that lined its bed, as well as the sandstone heights near the Old Forts. The creek was wide enough for settlers to build, dock and outfit numerous flatboats, keelboats, and other river craft. Its builders made thousands of pole boats that moved the emigrants who settled the vast Northwest Territory. Later Brownsville industry built the first steamboats on the inland rivers, and many hundreds afterwards.

Colonists used the term "Old Forts" for the mounds and earthworks created by the prehistoric Mound Builders cultures. Archeologists and anthropologists have since determined that many prehistoric Native American cultures in North America along the Mississippi River and its tributaries built massive earthworks for ceremonial, burial and religious purposes over a period of thousands of years prior to European encounter. For instance, the Mississippian culture, reaching a peak about 1150 CE at Cahokia in present-day Illinois, had sites throughout the Mississippi and Ohio river valleys, and into the Southeast. Archaeological research is ongoing working to tie the local mounds and others regionally close to a particular era and culture.

== Demographics ==
Historical population
Census	Pop.	Note	%±
1810	698		—
1820	976		39.8%
1830	1,222		25.2%
1840	1,362		11.5%
1850	2,369		73.9%
1860	1,934		−18.4%
1870	1,749		−9.6%
1880	1,489		−14.9%
1890	1,417		−4.8%
1900	1,552		9.5%
1910	2,324		49.7%
1920	2,502		7.7%
1930	2,869		14.7%
1940	8,015		179.4%
1950	7,643		−4.6%
1960	6,055		−20.8%
1970	4,856		−19.8%
1980	4,043		−16.7%
1990	3,164		−21.7%
2000	2,804		−11.4%
2010	2,331		−16.9%
2020	2,185		−6.3%
2021 (est.)	2,152	▼	−1.5%

As of the 2000 census, there were 2,804 people, 1,238 households, and 716 families residing in the borough. The population density was 2,796.6 inhabitants per square mile (1,079.8/km^{2}). There were 1,550 housing units at an average density of 1,545.9 per square mile (596.9/km^{2}). The racial makeup of the borough was 85.95% White, 11.41% African American, 0.11% Native American, 0.07% Asian, 0.21% from other races, and 2.25% from two or more races. Hispanic or Latino of any race were 0.82% of the population.

There were 1,238 households, out of which 24.7% had children under the age of 18 living with them, 36.2% were married couples living together, 17.0% had a female householder with no husband present, and 42.1% were non-families. 38.0% of all households were made up of individuals, and 20.5% had someone living alone who was 65 years of age or older. The average household size was 2.24 and the average family size was 2.97.

In the borough the population was spread out, with 23.2% under the age of 18, 9.0% from 18 to 24, 25.6% from 25 to 44, 21.1% from 45 to 64, and 21.1% who were 65 years of age or older. The median age was 40 years. For every 100 females, there were 83.1 males. For every 100 females age 18 and over, there were 77.7 males.

The median income for a household in the borough was $18,559, and the median income for a family was $32,662. Males had a median income of $31,591 versus $21,830 for females. The per capita income for the borough was $13,404. About 28.8% of families and 34.3% of the population were below the poverty line, including 51.2% of those under age 18 and 17.9% of those age 65 or over.

== Features ==
Dunlap's Creek Bridge (1839) under part of the level stretch of Market Street, carrying old U.S. Route 40 over Dunlap's Creek in Brownsville, is the nation's oldest cast iron bridge in existence. (Capt. Richard Delafield, engineer; John Snowdon and John Herbertson, foundrymen)

The Flatiron Building (c. 1830), constructed as a business building in thriving 19th-century Brownsville, is one of the oldest, most intact iron commercial structures west of the Allegheny Mountains. Over its history, it has housed private commercial entities as well as public, such as a post office. It is the unofficial "prototype" for the flatiron buildings seen across the United States. The most notable is the Flatiron Building in Market Square in New York City.

After nearly being demolished, the building was saved by the Brownsville Area Revitalization Corporation (BARC). Throughout two decades, via private and public grants, BARC has restored the Flatiron Building as an historic asset to Brownsville. The Flatiron Building Heritage Center, located within the building at 69 Market Street, holds artifacts from Brownsville's heyday, as well as displays about the community's important coal and coke heritage. The Frank L. Melega Art Museum, located with the Heritage Center, displays many examples of this local southwestern Pennsylvanian's famous artwork, depicting the coal and coke era in the surrounding tri-state region.

In addition to the Dunlap's Creek Bridge, Brownsville is the location of other properties on the National Register of Historic Places. They are Bowman's Castle (Nemacolin Castle), Brownsville Bridge, St. Peter's Church, and Thomas H. Thompson House. There are two national historic districts: the Brownsville Commercial Historic District and Brownsville Northside Historic District.

== Education ==
The Brownsville Area School District serves Brownsville as well as several nearby communities. Schools within the district are:

- Brownsville Area High School (9–12)
- Brownsville Area Middle School (6–8)
- Brownsville Area Elementary School (K–5)

== Infrastructure ==
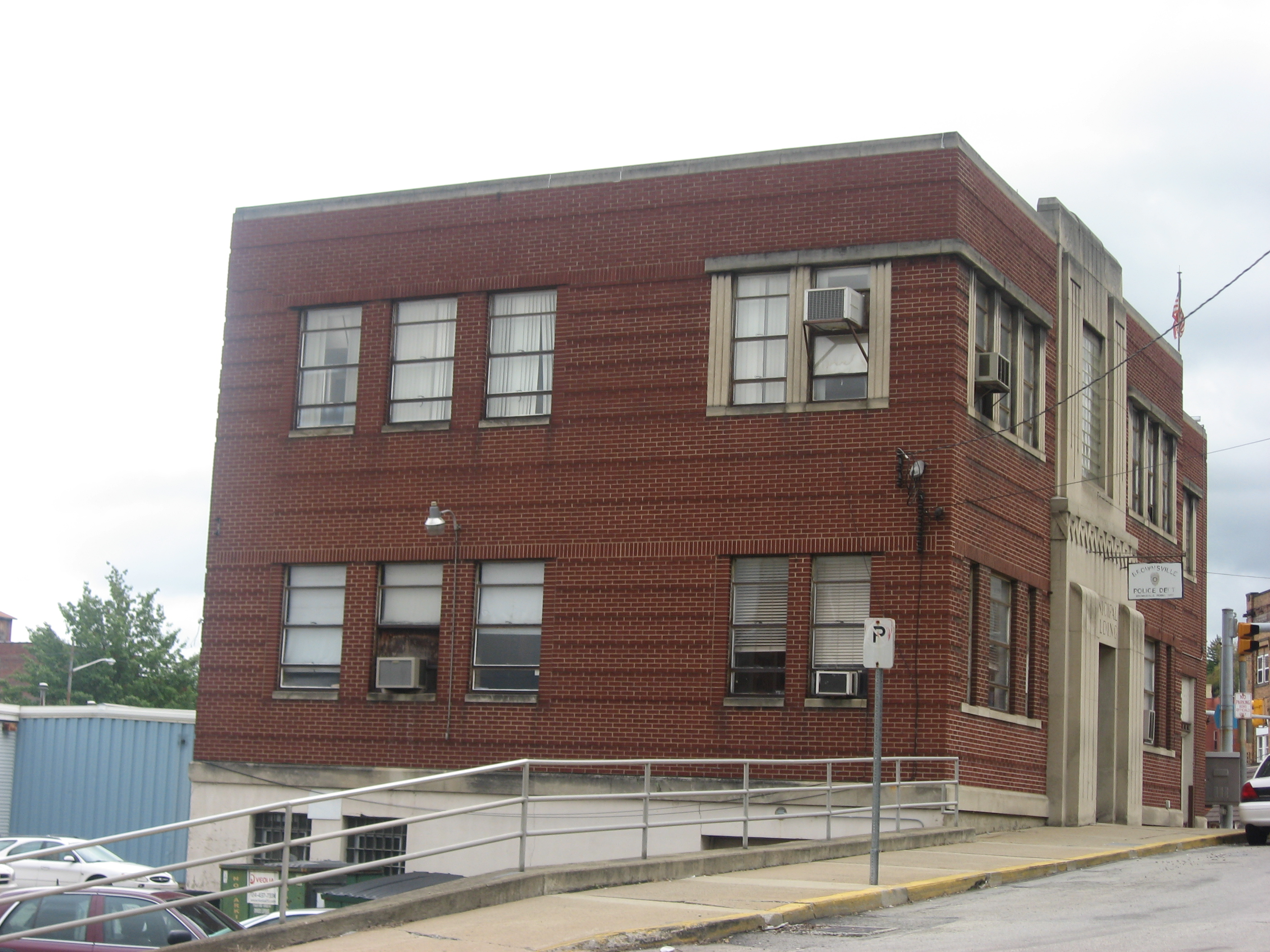
Municipal building

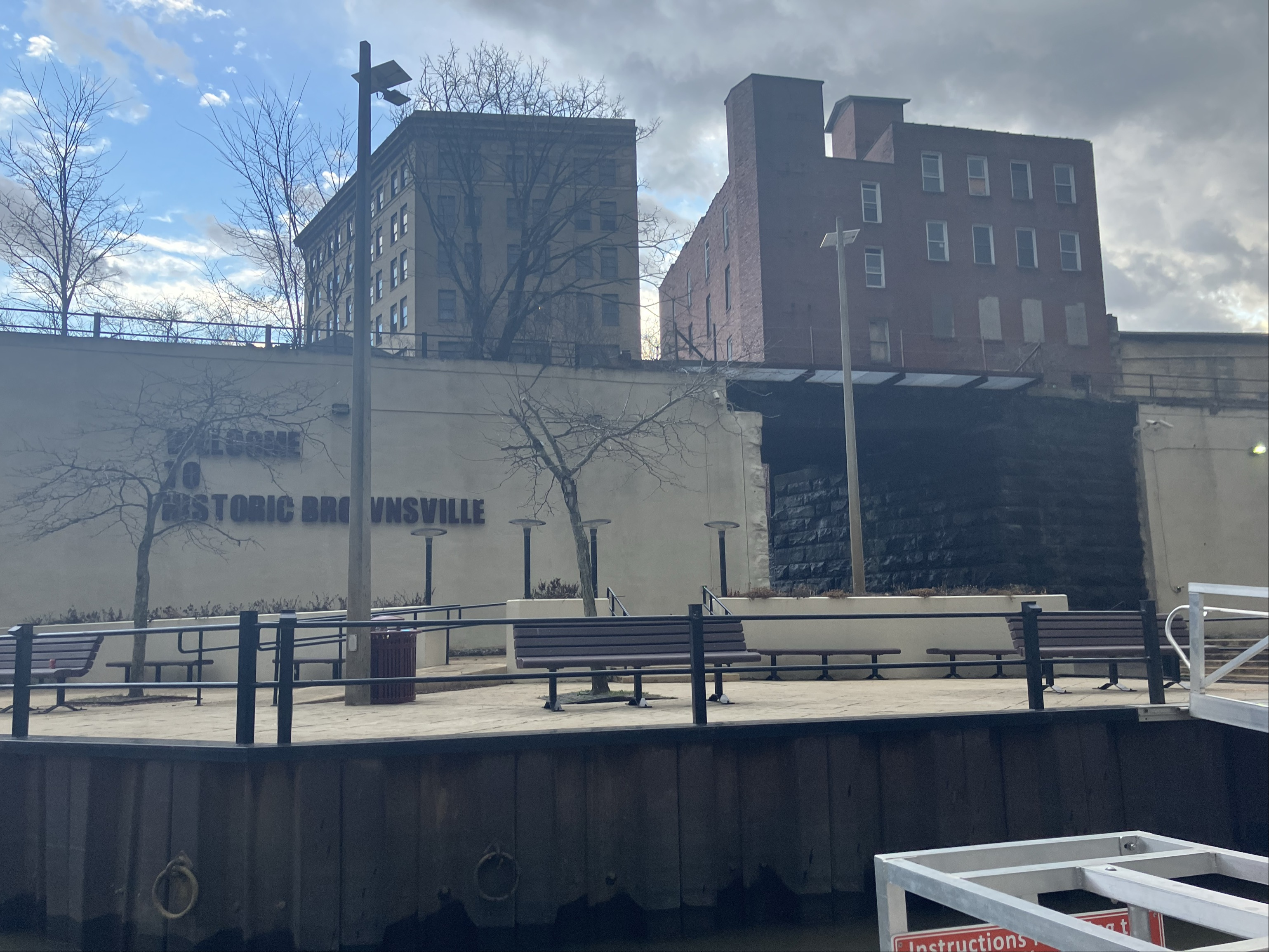
Riverside Wharf Park, downtown Brownsville

=== Transportation ===
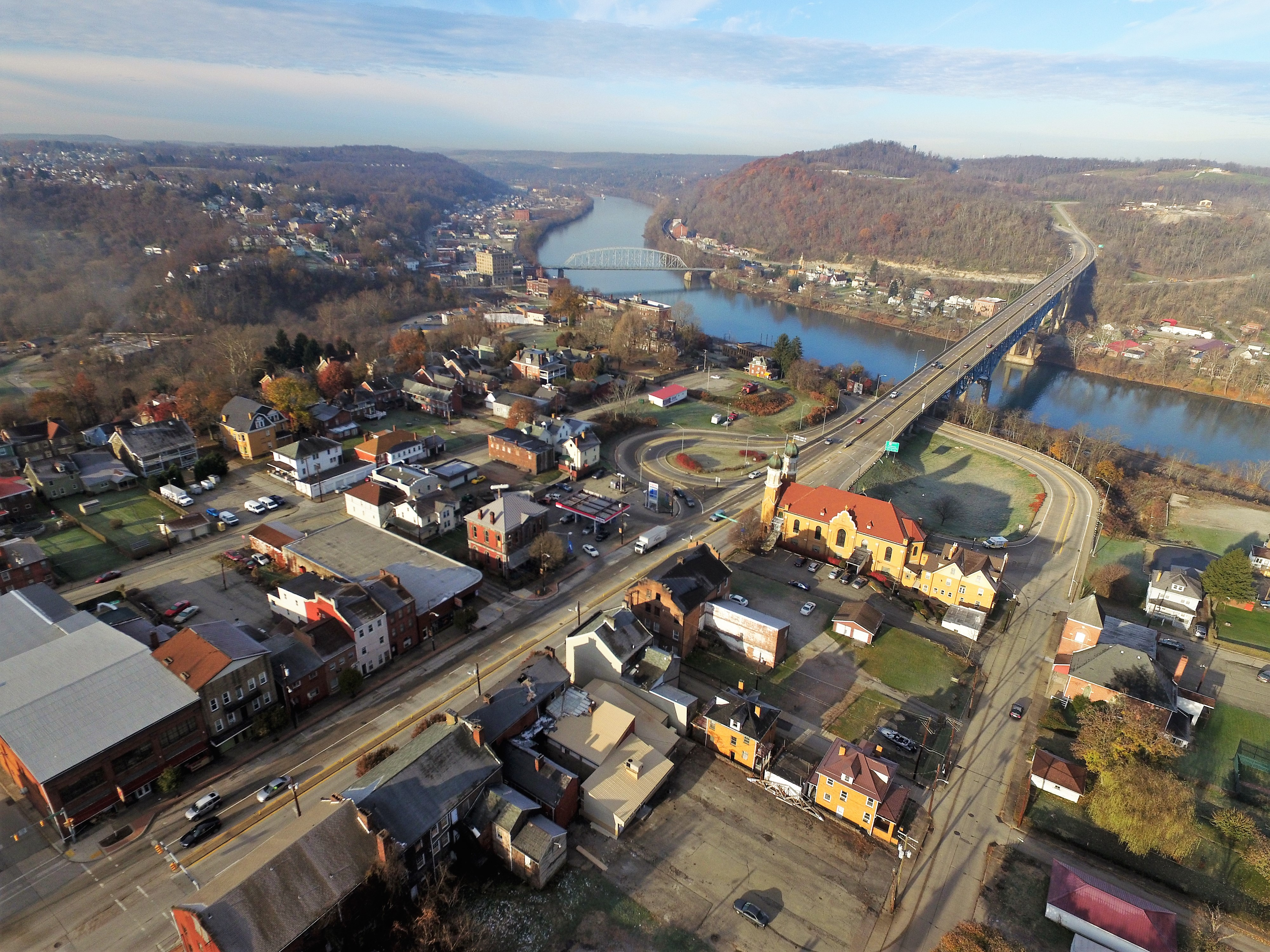
Aerial photo of Brownsville, looking over the Monongahela River

Brownsville is located on the banks of the Monongahela River, a major tributary of the Ohio River, one of North America's most important waterways. The Monongahela is fully navigable at Brownsville, and offers inexpensive barge transportation to Chicago, New Orleans, St. Marks in Florida, Minneapolis, Tulsa, Kansas City, Houston, and Brownsville, Texas, on the border with Mexico. The shipyards of Brownsville, Pennsylvania, provided Captain Richard King of Brownsville, Texas (founder of the King Ranch), with powerful new-built riverboats to navigate the fast currents of the Rio Grande in 1849.

Brownsville is connected to the satellite community of West Brownsville (in Washington County) by the Brownsville Bridge completed in 1914, which spans the Monongahela River. In 1960, the Lane Bane Bridge was constructed just downstream, and path of U.S. Route 40 was moved to the new high-level structure and new four lane highway by-passing old Route 40 until the two merged in the small bedroom neighborhood known locally as Malden. (Note: Malden is a hamlet of four groups of a few dozen homes each plus those lining Old U.S. Route 40, the National Road, with the two largest suburban-style housing developments ranged off to either side of the old 40-highway after it has climbed out of the valley of the Monongahela and reached a mostly flat stretch from east to west) In the heyday of Conestoga wagon migration travels and with the congestion of Brownsville's hilly terrain, the flat lands about Malden just two-to-three further on offered rare open spaces for west-bound travelers to camp and recuperate from the rigorous mountain descent.

Before the highway construction of the late 1950s was completed in the early 60s, two additional branchlike housing concentrations existed, the lined either side of "California Road" which intersected Old U.S. 40 in the heart of the small business district at landmarks, Paci's Restaurant and Cuppies Drive-In Theatre; the former set in a 17th-century stone Inn. The fourth concentration of housing extended from beside and beyond Cuppies Drive-In for over a mile either side of U.S. 40, now once again, single lane secondary highway. The community has few stores and several housing developments sited along a hilly plateau above the river valleys. The California Area High School is in part sited within parts of Malden.

== Notable people ==
- Benjamin W. Arnett (1838–1906), Bishop of A.M.E. Church, civil rights activist, Bishop at Wilberforce University in Ohio
- John Brashear (1840–1920), astronomer and builder of scientific instruments
- Thomas Brown (1738–1797), founder and entrepreneur
- Vinnie Colaiuta (born 1956 in Brownsville, but lived in Republic), renowned jazz-rock-pop drummer
- Richard G. Colbert (February 12, 1915 – December 2, 1973), four-star admiral in the United States Navy and former President of the Naval War College
- Doug Dascenzo (born 1964), former MLB outfielder with the Chicago Cubs, Texas Rangers and San Diego Padres
- Bill Eadie (born 1947), three-time WWF tag team champion Ax of Demolition
- Daniel French (1770–1853), pioneering designer and builder of steam engines
- Israel Gregg (1775–1847), first captain of the steamboat Enterprise
- Andy Gresh (born 1974) talk show host, television host, color commentator
- Alfred Hunt (1817–1888), first president of Bethlehem Iron Company, precursor of Bethlehem Steel Corporation
- Esther Hunt (1751–1820), a pioneer who lived on America's frontier as a wife, a mother and a leader in her Quaker faith
- Lisa Kirk (1925–1990), singer and actress
- Philander C. Knox (1853–1921), lawyer and politician who served as United States Attorney General (1901–1904), a senator from Pennsylvania (1904–1909, 1917–1921) and Secretary of State (1909–1913)
- Gary L. Lancaster (1949–2013), United States court judge
- Andy Linden (1922–1987), Indy car driver
- George E. Marcus (born 1946), anthropologist
- Thomas Novak (born 1952), mining safety engineer
- Samuel Shapiro, state treasurer of Maine (1981–1996)
- Henry Miller Shreve (1785–1851), pioneering steamboat captain, and steamboat designer
- Jacob B. Sweitzer (1821–1881), Civil War Union Army brigade commander
- Joe Taffoni (1945–2021), NFL player
- Amos Townsend (1821–1895), U.S. congressman
- Bill Viola (born 1947), martial arts instructor
