= Lane Bane Bridge =

Bridge in Pennsylvania, United States

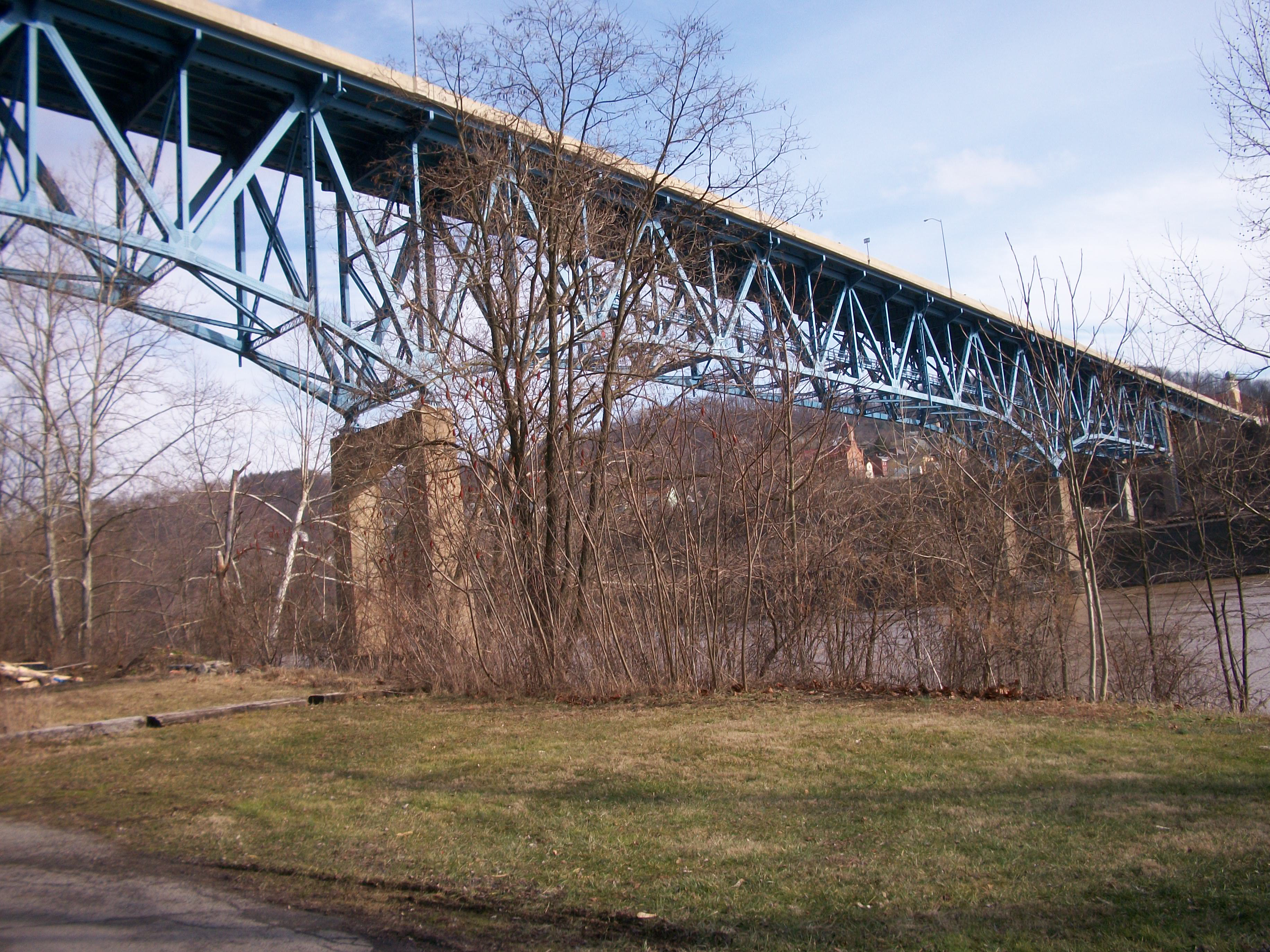
- The bridge's main span crosses the Monongahela.
- Coordinates: 40.02503°N 79.88509°W
- Carries: 4 divided lanes of US 40
- Crosses: Monongahela River
- Locale: Brownsville, Pennsylvania and West Brownsville, Pennsylvania

Characteristics
- Design: Truss bridge
- Total length: 2,133 feet (650 m)
- Width: 60 feet (18 m)
- Longest span: 518 feet (158 m)

History
- Opened: 1960

Location
- Interactive map of Lane Bane Bridge

The Lane Bane Bridge is an American truss bridge that carries vehicular traffic across the Monongahela River between Brownsville, Pennsylvania and West Brownsville, Pennsylvania.

== History and architectural features ==
This high-level bridge was completed in November 1962 and was originally designed to be part of the Mon-Fayette Expressway. A 3 miles (4.8 km) freeway segment stretches from the west bank of the bridge, and a final exit is contained directly on the eastern shore.

The structure was designed not only to provide a river crossing without having to enter the associated deep valley, but to also carry vehicles high above the main streets of West Brownsville.

== See also ==
- List of crossings of the Monongahela River

== Gallery ==
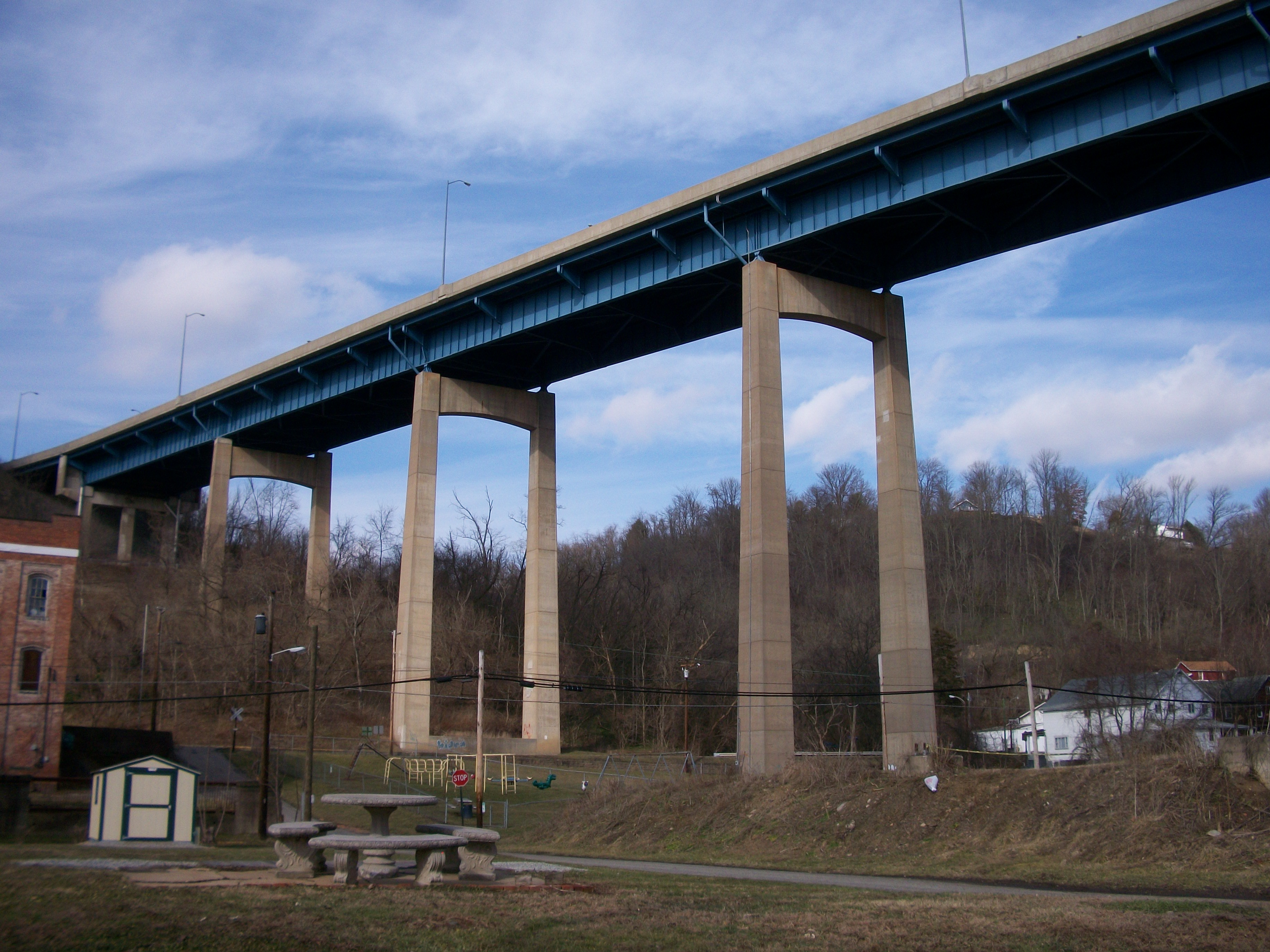
Western portion of span over West Brownsville

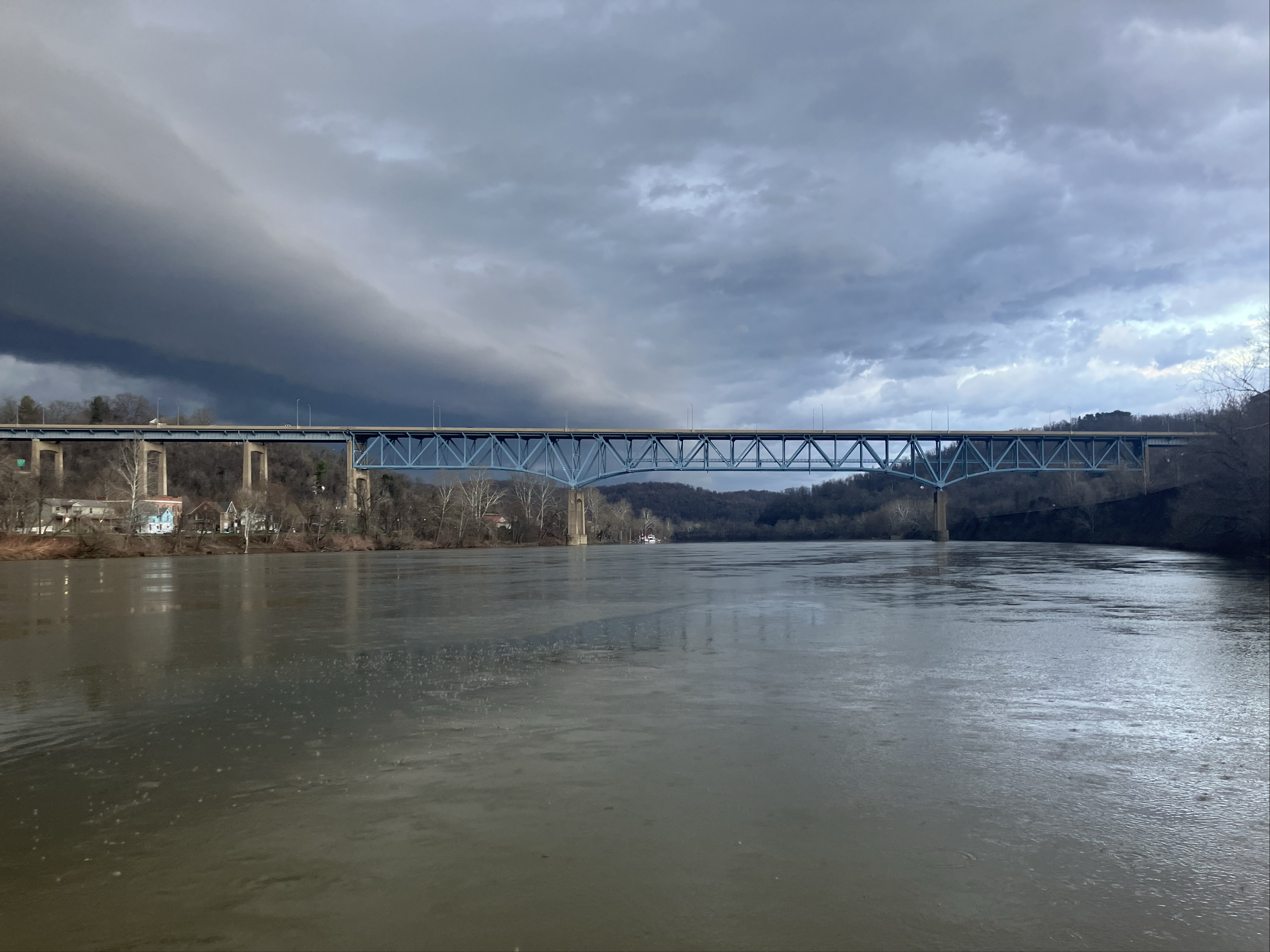
Lane Bane Bridge Brownsville Pennsylvania
