= West Brownsville, Pennsylvania =

Borough in Pennsylvania, US

West Brownsville
- Borough
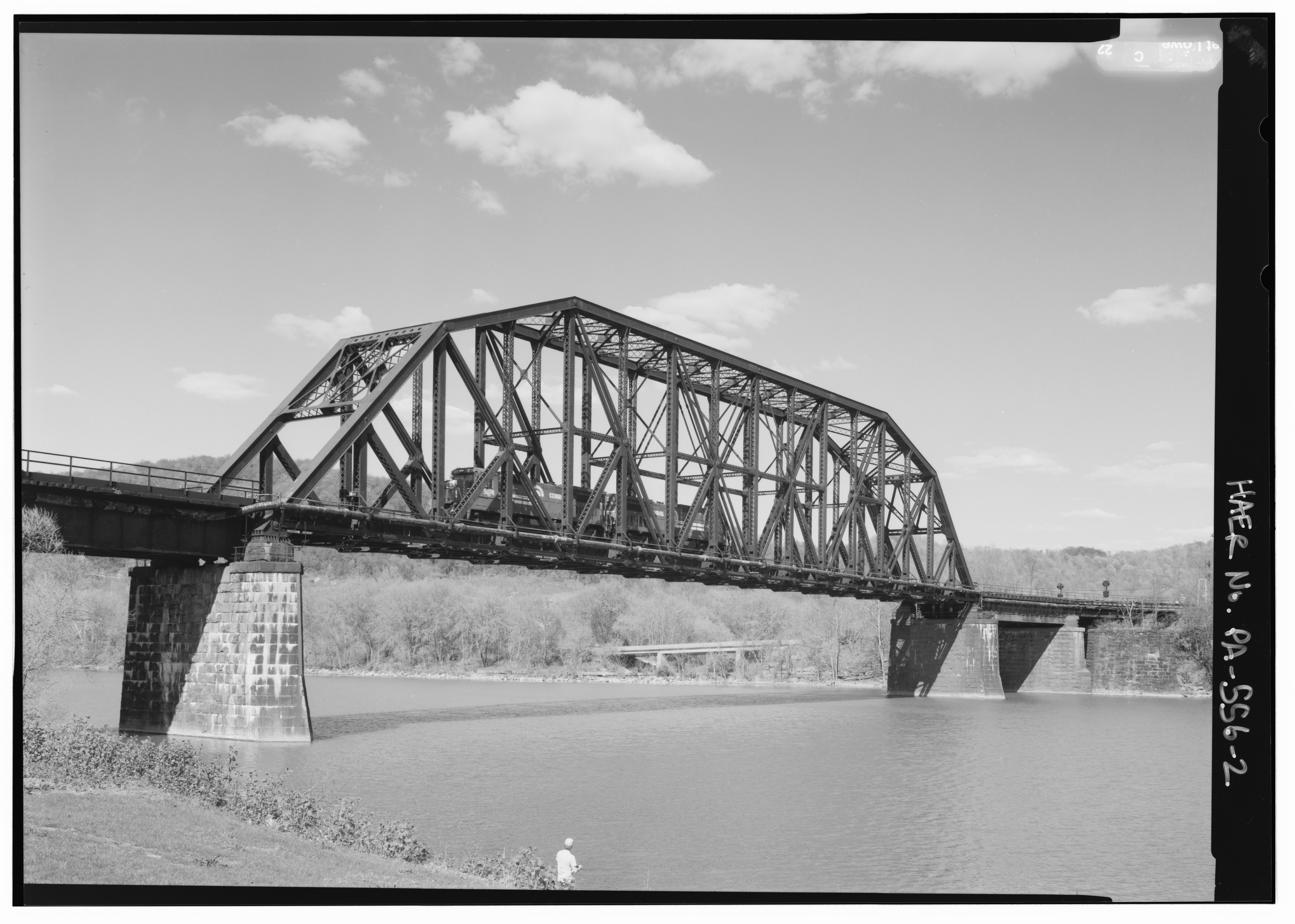
- West Brownsville Junction Bridge, spanning the Monongahela River

- Location of West Brownsville in Washington County, Pennsylvania.

- Location of West Brownsville in Pennsylvania
- Coordinates: 40°1′47″N 79°53′11″W
- Country: United States
- State: Pennsylvania
- County: Washington
- Established: 1831

Government
  - Mayor: W Dean Lacey
  - Borough Council: Members: Jim Pflugh; Von Braddock; Richard Black; Randy; Andrea Stimmell; Debby King; I. Patrick Toth

Area
  - Total: 1.42 sq mi (3.68 km^{2})
  - Land: 1.30 sq mi (3.36 km^{2})
  - Water: 0.12 sq mi (0.32 km^{2})

Population (2020)
  - Total: 977
  - Density: 752.2/sq mi (290.42/km^{2})
- Time zone: UTC-4 (EST)
  - Summer (DST): UTC-5 (EDT)
- ZIP code: 15417
- Greater Pittsburgh: 724
- FIPS code: 42-82616
- Website: https://westbrownsvillepa.com/

West Brownsville is a former important transportation nexus and a present-day borough in Washington County, Pennsylvania, United States, and part of the Pittsburgh metropolitan area. The population was 972 at the 2020 census. Culturally, by postal route, and socially, the community is connected to cross-river sister-city Brownsville. The two towns were long joined by the Amerindian trail known as Nemacolin's Path that became a wagon road after the American Revolution. In present times, however, West Brownsville is a separate municipality. Brownsville was the first point where the descent from the Appalachians could safely reach the river down the generally steep banks of the Monongahela River. Between Brownsville and West Brownsville was a shallow stretch, usable as a river ford astride a major Emigrant Trail to the various attractive regions in the Northwest Territory, the first National Road, the Cumberland Pike (Now U.S. Route 40 (Note: In the late 1950s in order to ease a perennial traffic jam, the upper stretch of Brownsville's Market Street was subjected to eminent domain and widened to have four lanes of traffic plus parking. In the same project lower Market street and the zig-zag of U.S. Route 40 across the West Brownsville bridge and a hilly loop of the National Road to Malden, Pennsylvania, was bypassed by construction of the Lane Bane Bridge viaduct and a three mile stretch of four lane divided highway as a new path of U.S. Route 40. Subsequently, the old path of U.S. 40 have been renamed Old US40. Old National Pike, and such references.)).

== Geography ==
West Brownsville is located at 40°1′47″N 79°53′11″W (40.029731, -79.886412).

According to the United States Census Bureau, the borough has a total area of 1.4 square miles (3.6 km^{2}), of which 1.3 square miles (3.4 km^{2}) is land and 0.1 square miles (0.26 km^{2}) (8.51%) is water.

== History ==
The first "improvement" made on the present site of West Brownsville was made by William Peters, alias "Indian Peter" and "Mohawk Peter", a Mohawk man who bought land from the state of Pennsylvania across from Redstone Old Fort in 1769. Peters is mentioned as living "opposite ye Fort Burd" with his Euro-American wife and children in the early 1760s in the journals of Quaker merchant James Kenny.

West Brownsville was sited on the inside of the sweeping curve along the Monongahela River and has relatively level ground opposite the cut bank effect giving Brownsville relatively steep slopes and West Brownsville, cupped by the inside of the curve, more flood-prone sandy mud flats lands. Historically, at a bit upstream of the location of the Brownsville-West Brownsville Bridge was the Amerindian crossing ford and wagon road of early westward migrants. A few hundred yards west from the shoreline, PA Route 88 enters from along the riverside bluff and the south as Lowhill Road and hugs the foot of the steep Pennsylvania hillsides flanking tongue-shaped flat terrain of the streets and housing through most of the length of W. Brownsville before twisting left uphill. It exits the W. Brownsville flat climbing Northwest as Blainsburg Road, climbing beside and below the bluff of Blainsburg, a larger 'satellite' bedroom community really an extension of the community, situated above West Brownsville proper, to its North-Northwest.

The steep bluff behind the West Brownsville tongue provided two climbable ascents which became early U.S. roads; the more southerly heading nearly due west climbing steadily upwards over a 2.5 miles (4.0 km) stretch, an old wagon road, and later the National Road following the westward extension of Nemacolin's Path up to and through the outlier neighborhood known as Malden from a river-shallows area known as a ford to Amerindians, a landscape feature which attracted settlers heading west on the Emigrant Trail once known as Nemacolin's Path, then the Cumberland Road and then renamed as the 'National Road'. The other ascent would allow PA Route 88 to climb out of the valley where the road cut across several loops of the Monongahela to California. (Note: PA Route 88 is a left bank road that generally follows the Monongahela from just above West Virginia to the outskirts of Pittsburgh, at PA Route 51 near the Liberty Tunnel. The Norfolk and Western bridge crosses above the highway junction near the tunnel mouth and downtown Pittsburgh is just 'through Mount Washington' and across the Monongahela.)

== Transportation and railroad ==
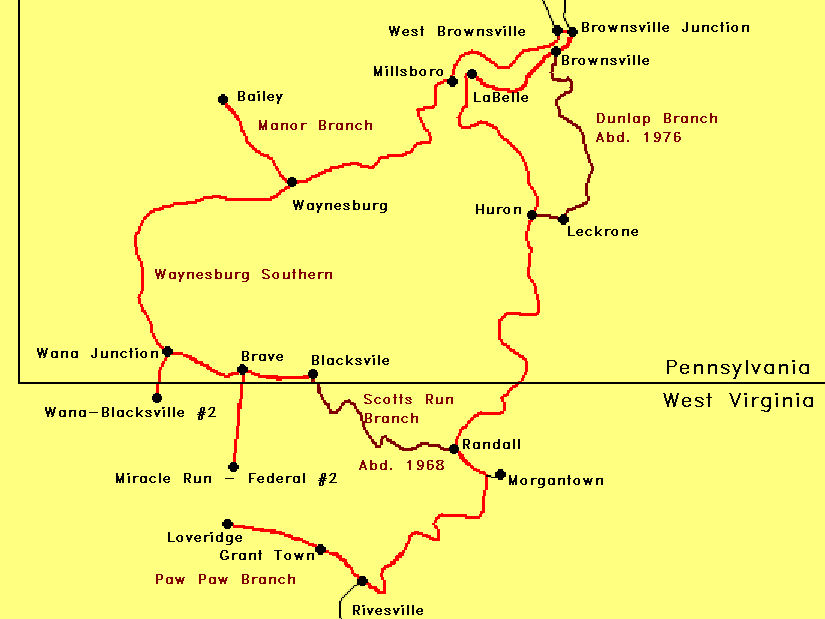
This map of the Monongahela Railroad Shortline shows the lower "Brownsville Junction" crossing bridge in between Brownsville and West Brownsville. The rail bridge is downriver from the former ferry ramps between the towns and both the old and new U.S. Route 40 bridges. Coke ovens lined the east bank trackage and the bridge off map to the north allowed entire trains to pull through and turn around for the run back to Fayette and Greene County, Pennsylvanian and West Virginian mines, keeping throughput up, and reducing the time dumping tracks were blocked by empty train consists of hopper cars.

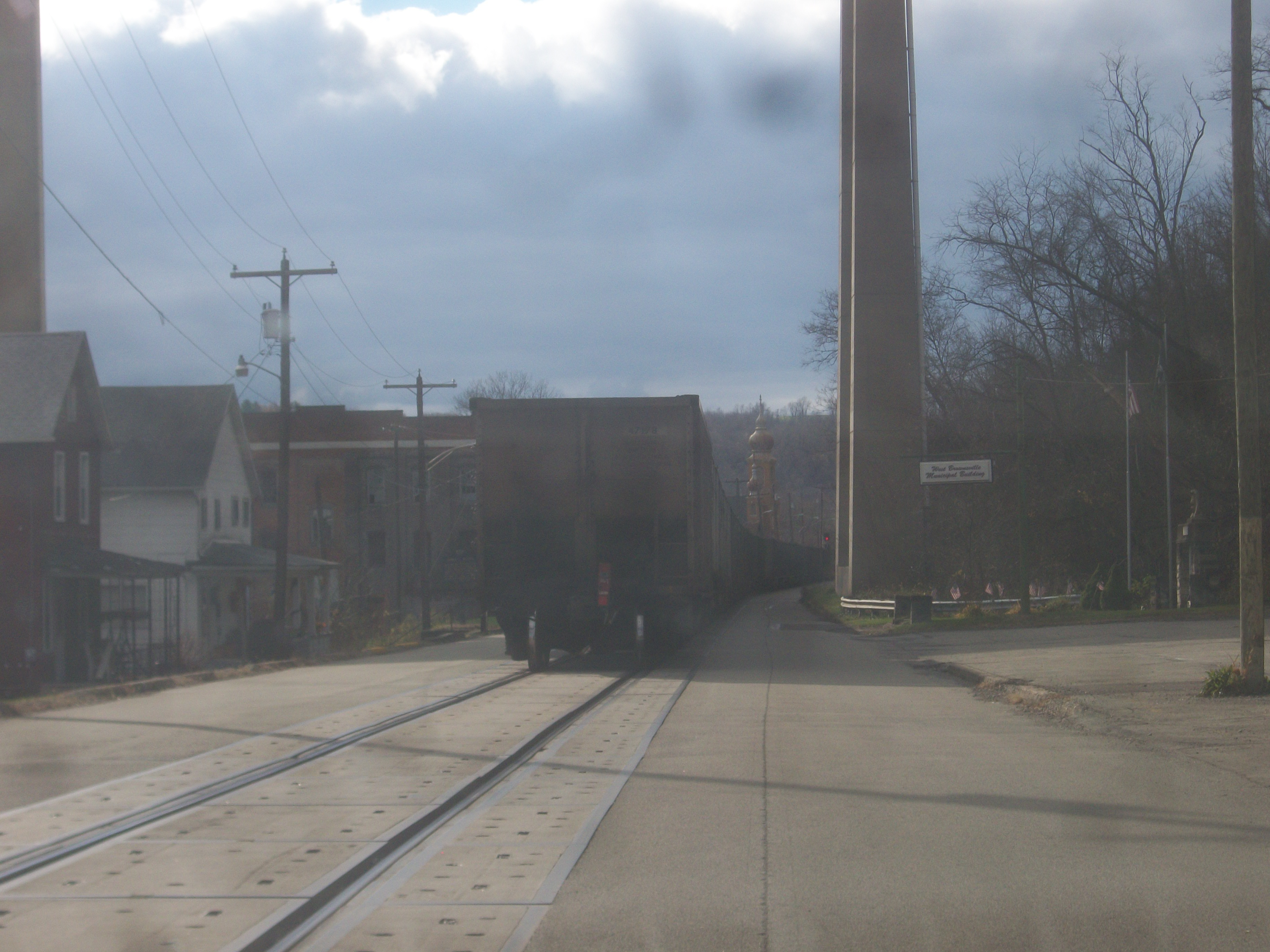
Street running through West Brownsville.

Sundered by the county boundaries running down the center of the river, West Brownsville economically was integrated with cross-river Brownsville by a ferry dating back into the early 1800s when Brownsville became a riverboat building and outfitting center. With construction of boats on nearby large tributaries, the shallow banks of West Brownsville were a favorite location to tie up and outfit a new built water craft to outfit it and load cargoes. The modern-day Main Street is notable for featuring on-street running by freight trains down the center of the street. Considered one railroad crossing, it is one of the longest crossings in the United States. Along with right bank Brownsville on the opposite shore, West Brownsville and Brownsville hosted extensive rail yards jammed into the tight confines along both banks of the Monongahela River. One special feature at either end of the two railyards was they each shared a bridge joining two river crossing wyes that tied together to contain a rare true-life reversing loop, normally a feature only found in model railroading layouts. The yards serviced the extensive rail hopper car deliveries feeding the coking ovens up river along the southside of Brownsville, and were integral parts of the famous Pittsburgh Steel Industries. The Monongahela Railroad represented the Lake Erie, the PRR, and the B&O, and Norfolk and Western both utilized the trackage in the towns, which today is operated by the N&W's successor, Norfolk Southern with the Monongahela vanishing into the Conrail debacle.

== Demographics ==
Historical population
Census	Pop.	Note	%±
1850	477		—
1860	613		28.5%
1870	547		−10.8%
1880	571		4.4%
1890	735		28.7%
1900	742		1.0%
1910	2,036		174.4%
1920	1,900		−6.7%
1930	1,717		−9.6%
1940	1,844		7.4%
1950	1,610		−12.7%
1960	1,907		18.4%
1970	1,426		−25.2%
1980	1,433		0.5%
1990	1,170		−18.4%
2000	1,075		−8.1%
2010	992		−7.7%
2020	977		−1.5%
2025 (est.)	960	▼	−1.7%
U.S. Decennial Census

As of the census of 2000, there were 1,075 people, 459 households, and 312 families residing in the borough. The population density was 831.7 inhabitants per square mile (321.1/km^{2}). There were 527 housing units at an average density of 407.7 per square mile (157.4/km^{2}). The racial makeup of the borough was 98.14% White, 0.65% African American, 0.09% Native American, 0.74% from other races, and 0.37% from two or more races. Hispanic or Latino of any race were 0.37% of the population.

There were 459 households, out of which 24.4% had children under the age of 18 living with them, 51.0% were married couples living together, 10.5% had a female householder with no husband present, and 32.0% were non-families. 27.9% of all households were made up of individuals, and 15.0% had someone living alone who was 65 years of age or older. The average household size was 2.34 and the average family size was 2.82.

In the borough the population was spread out, with 16.8% under the age of 18, 10.1% from 18 to 24, 25.5% from 25 to 44, 25.5% from 45 to 64, and 22.0% who were 65 years of age or older. The median age was 43 years. For every 100 females, there were 96.5 males. For every 100 females age 18 and over, there were 94.3 males.

The median income for a household in the borough was $27,315, and the median income for a family was $36,641. Males had a median income of $31,964 versus $21,875 for females. The per capita income for the borough was $15,368. About 10.4% of families and 13.5% of the population were below the poverty line, including 33.3% of those under age 18 and 5.4% of those age 65 or over.

== Notable residents ==
- James G. Blaine - United States Secretary of State, Senator, and Republican presidential candidate
