= Fort Cumberland (Maryland) =

18th-century frontier fort at the current site of Cumberland, Maryland

Coordinates: 39.6511°N 78.7653°W

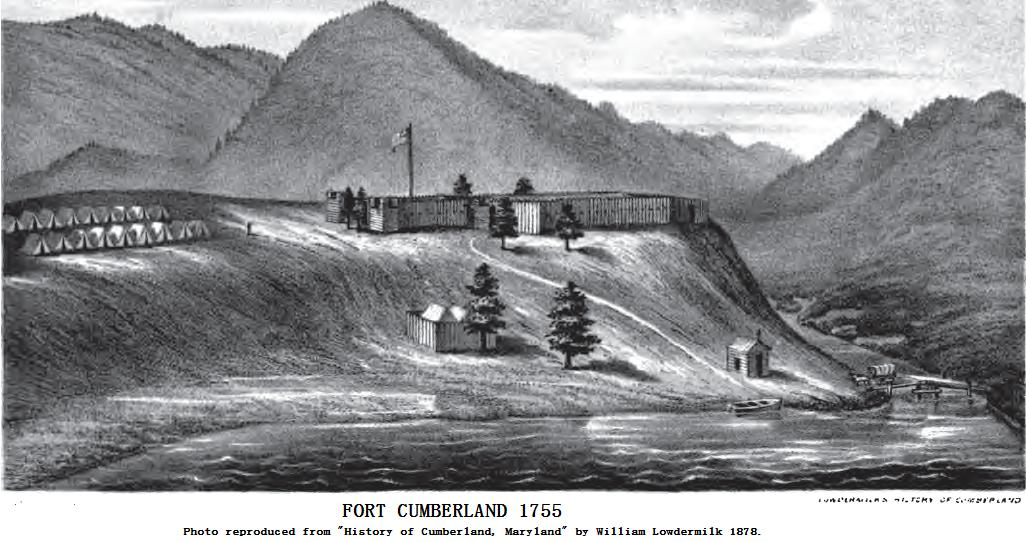
Fort Cumberland, 1755 (1878)

Fort Cumberland (built 1754) was an 18th-century frontier fort at the current site of Cumberland, Maryland, USA. It was an important military and economic center during the French and Indian War (1754–63) and figured significantly in the early career of George Washington.

== History ==
At the current location of the city of Cumberland, Maryland, a crude frontier fort was constructed at the confluence of Wills Creek and the Potomac River in fall 1754 by troops of the Maryland militia, under the command of Captain John Dagworthy, and under the overall command of Colonel James Innes, the commander-in-chief of colonial forces at that time. A few years earlier, Thomas Cresap had established a trading post nearby, and hired Native Americans including the local chief Nemacolin to blaze a shorter path across the Allegheny Mountains to Redstone Creek on the Monongahela River, which became known as Nemacolin's Path. Initially named Fort Mount Pleasant, it was renamed Fort Cumberland in 1755. Ft Cumberland figured prominently in the French & Indian War in 1755, when it became a rally point for British forces under command of General Braddock. The wood palisade fort is now gone, and occupying the site is the existing Emmanuel Episcopal Church, but the old fort tunnels still remain underneath.

This fort once marked the westernmost outpost of the British Empire in America, and was the jumping-off point for General Braddock's disastrous expedition against the French at Fort Duquesne in present-day Pittsburgh, Pennsylvania. When Braddock was killed, a young officer of Virginia militia, George Washington, led the troops back to Fort Cumberland. At the fort, Washington clashed with Captain Dagworthy over the issue of military rank and which colonial officer should be in command: Washington was a major in the Virginia militia, outranking the Maryland captain, but Dagworthy countered that because he also held a royal commission as a captain in the Provincial Troops, he automatically outranked any colonial militia officer.

Fort Cumberland was a supply center of basic provisions such as flour, salt, and lead for the Western Department of the Continental Army during the American Revolutionary War. The fort also served as a prisoner-of-war camp for British prisoners from about 1778 until the end of the war.

== Description ==
In May 1755, one of the British officers with General Braddock described the newly christened Fort Cumberland: "[It] is situated within 200 yards of Will's Creek, on a hill and about 400 from the Potomack; its length from east to west is about 200 yards, and breadth 46 yards, and is built by logs driven into the ground, and about 12 feet above it." Eleven days later, he reported that 100 carpenters were at work building a magazine and constructing a bridge over Will's Creek.

Eventually Fort Cumberland evolved into an earthen fort with twenty-foot-thick earthworks.

Diagrams and drawings of the fort exist in the British Museum. A scale model of the fort resides in the aforementioned church .

== Fort Cumberland's dependent forts ==
- Fort Ohio, Earlier fort built across the river in Ridgeley, West Virginia
- Fort Sellers
- Fort Ashby, Earlier fort built in Fort Ashby, West Virginia.
- Fort Cocke, Earlier fort built upstream from Fort Ashby, West Virginia
- Fort Pleasant (Fort Van Meter), On the upper South Branch
