= Nemacolin =

Delaware chief

Chief Nemacolin
- Born: c. 1715; Fort Christina, Delaware
- Died: c. 1767; Blennerhassett Island, Ohio River, West Virginia
- Parent(s): Checochinican and Poynton

Nemacolin (c. 1715 – c. 1767) was a hereditary chief of the Delaware Nation who helped Thomas Cresap widen a Native American path across the Allegheny Mountains to the Ohio River Valley.

== Biography ==
The son of Checochinican (Chickoconecon), chief of the Fish Clan of the Turtle tribe, Nemacolin was born near the Brandywine Creek, probably close to the Swedish trading post at Fort Christina that later became Wilmington, Delaware. By a treaty with William Penn in 1726, various tribes either rented or gave up their land on both sides of Brandywine Creek. Nemacolin likely grew up near Shamokin, Pennsylvania, a village near the Susquehanna River to which the Delaware had retreated when faced with disease and colonization of their traditional lands by white settlers. His family grew to know trader Thomas Cresap, and moved south and west with the Cresap family, likely after a controversy between groups of settlers aligned with the colonies of Maryland and Pennsylvania known as Cresap's War.

Circa 1750, Cresap received instructions to improve the Native American path across the Appalachian Mountains through the Cumberland Narrows. He hired Nemacolin and his two sons, among others, to complete the task between Will's Creek (a trading post on a tributary of the Potomac River later the site of Fort Cumberland) and the mouth of Redstone Creek on the Monongahela River (a tributary of the Ohio River) which later became Redstone Old Fort and even later Brownsville, Pennsylvania. A side trail led to the residence of Christopher Gist. Gist led George Washington along Nemacolin's Path in 1753 and 1754. It was later improved to permit supply wagons for General Edward Braddock's army, and the General ultimately died on the route in 1755 after the disastrous Battle of the Monongahela near present-day Pittsburgh. About 1759, as the war ended, Nemacolin reblazed the path to the residence of James Burd which became Fort Burd and later renamed Redstone Old Fort. Another branch went to Uniontown, Pennsylvania.

== Later years and death ==
After blazing the trails, Nemacolin moved the remainder of his tribe to a site alternately known as Shawnee Town or Neal's Landing on what later became known as Blennerhassett Island in the Ohio River, today part of West Virginia. After the peace treaty, as he had after blazing the trail with Cresap and Gist, Nemocolin renewed his tribe's claim that Penn and subsequent settlers had broken the treaty terms in establishing permanent settlements in what had been his tribe's lands, to no avail. Nemacolin died on the island in 1767, and European settlers soon laid claim to that land.

== Legacy ==
After the American Revolution once again permitted trans-Allegheny settlement, settlers named the route for the general rather than the Native American ally. Decades later, the National Road was built over parts of Nemacolin's Path.

A statue honoring Chief Nemacolin stands in the country club at Nemacolin Woodlands Resort, named after the chieftain in the early 20th century.

Nemacolin, Pennsylvania in Greene County was a planned community developed in the early 20th century around steelworks.

The site now known as Nemacolin's Castle in Brownsville, Pennsylvania may well have been visited by Chief Nemacolin, for a fireplace dates from the late 18th century, and the site had been inhabited by Native American peoples (probably the south Algonkian-speaking Shawnee who may have had mounds there). However, that building was long known as Bowman's castle, after three generations of merchant-industrialists.
