= Bowman's Castle =

Historic house in Pennsylvania, United States

- U.S. National Register of Historic Places
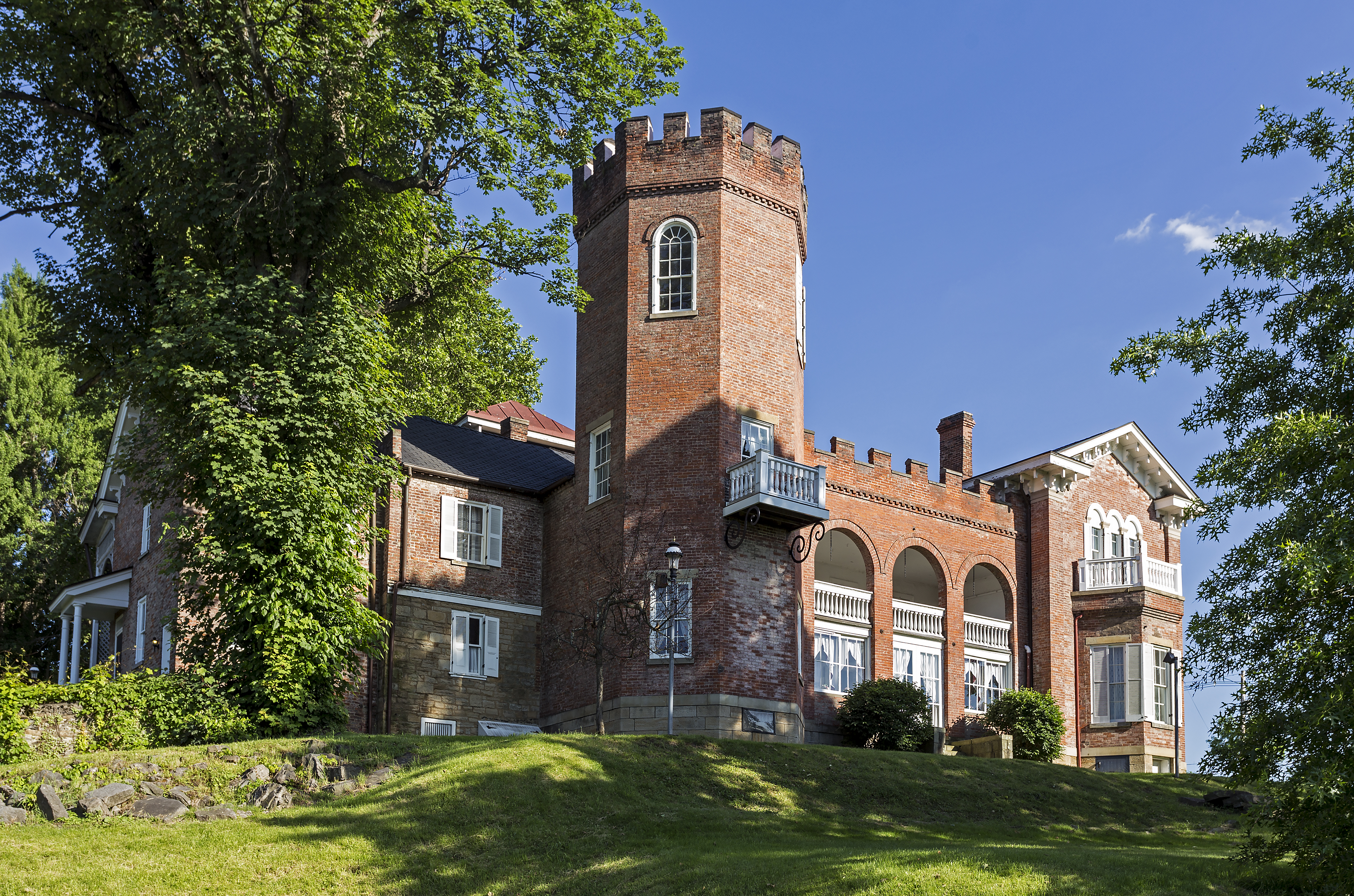
- Front of the castle

- Location within Pennsylvania Location within the United States
- Location: Front St., Brownsville, Pennsylvania
- Coordinates: 40°1′21″N 79°53′2″W
- Area: 1 acre (0.40 ha)
- Built: 1789
- Architect: Bowman, Jacob
- Architectural style: Late Victorian
- NRHP reference No.: 75001641
- Added to NRHP: March 3, 1975

Bowman's Castle, also known as Nemacolin Castle, was built in present-day Brownsville, Pennsylvania, at the western terminus of the Nemacolin's Trail on the east bank of the Monongahela River. It was built around the original trading post, which was built near the site of Fort Burd, the latter built by British colonists during the French and Indian War. Construction on the castle, including addition of a crenellated tower, continued through the Victorian era, when it was considered an engineering marvel.

== History ==
The trading post was built shortly after the American Revolutionary War, in the late 1780s. Founder of Brownsville (Thomas Brown) sold the land to a man named William Lynn in 1786. William eventually sold it to Jacob Bowman in July 1795 after his father's death the previous year, as stated in the Property Deed (Property Deed). Jacob Bowman began constructing the castle during the late 1790s in the community once known as Redstone. The trading post was located at the Redstone Creek river crossing. The community built flatboats for travelers and traders on the Ohio and Mississippi rivers. It was the long-time terminus of the western part of Nemacolin's Trail.

Likely more than 1,200 years before construction of the fort, trading post or castle, prehistoric indigenous peoples had also found this site a strategic one. They built the earthwork mounds which the colonists called Redstone Old Fort. Fort Burd was built on top of its sandstone base.

The Castle is one of several large buildings of the 1850s (In this case, the site holds part of Fort Burd; the well dug by the Fort Burd soldiers) still standing in western Pennsylvania. It is listed on the National Register of Historic Places. Its alternate name, Nemacolin's Castle, was derived from Nemacolin's Trail, named after the Lenape chief who helped improve and mark the ancient Native American trail through the Alleghenies. It connected the valleys of the Potomac River and the Ohio River drainage basin on the Monongahela River.

Three generations of the Bowman family were the only ones to live in the house/castle. Jacob Bowman and his wife started building the first part of the structure sometime around 1789 (before gaining full ownership of the land in 1795), with a trading post on the ground floor and one room above. Finding they needed more room, they added a broad hallway. They had nine children. At Jacob's death in 1847, he left the house to his son Nelson. Nelson added the east wing of the house and the brick tower.

Nelson Bowman and his wife, Elizabeth, also updated the nursery from a colonial to a Victorian style. Although Nelson married late in life, he and Elizabeth had six children. Only two survived to adulthood. When Nelson died in 1892, he left the house to their son Charles Bowman, who lived there with his wife Leila until his death. By her will, after the widow Leila Bowman died; years later The National Historical Society purchased the house and began to open it up to the public as a museum. It is now maintained and operated as a house museum by the Brownsville Historical Society.

It was listed on the National Register of Historic Places in 1975. It is located in the Brownsville Northside Historic District.

== Trivia ==
- Interior and exterior scenes for Pie Head: A Kinda True Story, directed by and starring newcomer Hollis McLachlan, were shot at the castle in May 2010.

== See also ==
- National Register of Historic Places listings in Fayette County, Pennsylvania
