= Little Meadows =

Little Meadows may refer to:

- Little Meadows, Maryland, a frequent campsite of George Washington.
- Little Meadows, Pennsylvania, a small town in northern Pennsylvania.
