= Brownsville Northside Historic District =

Historic district in Pennsylvania, United States

- U.S. National Register of Historic Places
- U.S. Historic district
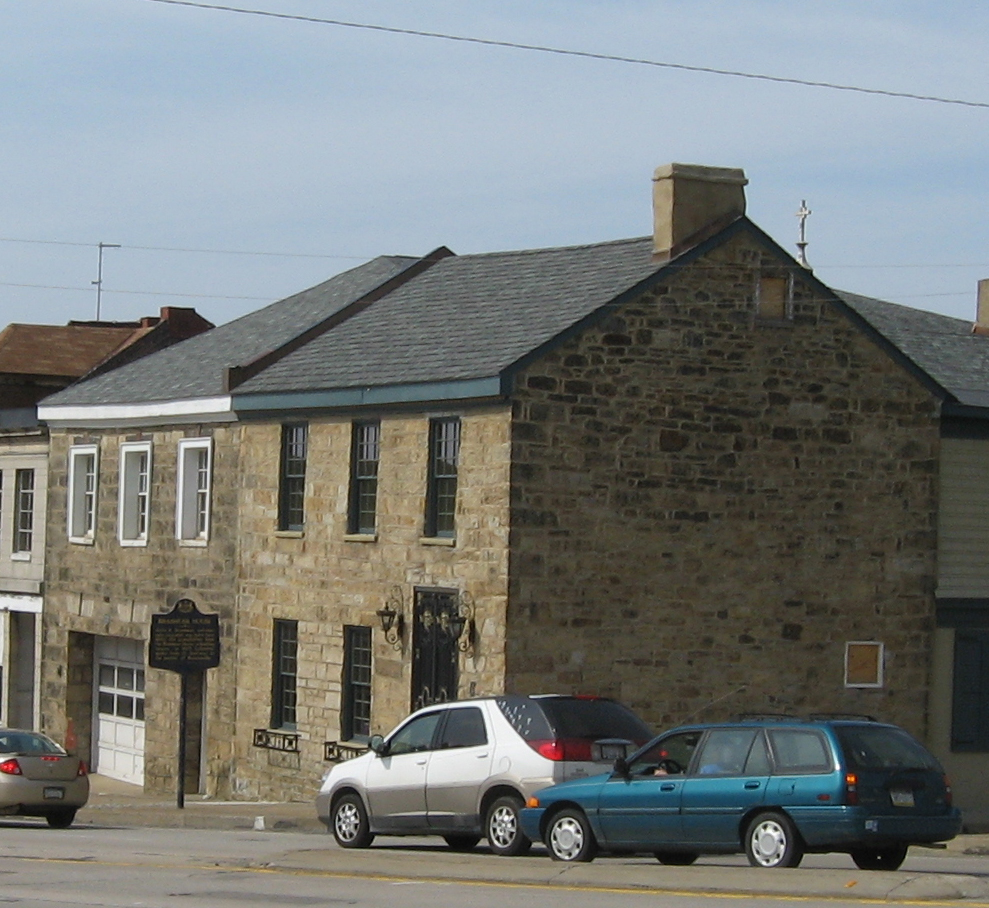
- Brashear's Tavern, April 2011

- Location within Pennsylvania Location within the United States
- Location: Roughly bounded by Front St., Broadway, Shaffner Rd. and Baltimore St., Brownsville, Pennsylvania
- Coordinates: 40°01′19″N 79°52′51″W
- Area: 17 acres (6.9 ha)
- Architect: Multiple
- Architectural style: Colonial Revival, Bungalow/craftsman, Greek Revival
- NRHP reference No.: 93000717
- Added to NRHP: August 2, 1993

Brownsville Northside Historic District is a national historic district located adjacent to the Brownsville Commercial Historic District at Brownsville, Pennsylvania. The district includes 188 contributing buildings and 2 contributing sites in a neighborhood of Brownsville. Most of the contributing buildings are residential, with some commercial buildings and nine churches. The house styles are reflective of a number of popular 19th- and early-20th-century architectural styles including Colonial Revival, Bungalow / American Craftsman, and Greek Revival. The oldest building is Brashear's Tavern (c. 1797), and there are five buildings that date between 1815 and 1840. The contributing sites are cemeteries associated with two of the churches, including Christ Church, the burial site of Brownsville namesake Thomas Brown. Located in the district and separately listed are the St. Peter's Church and Bowman's Castle.

It was added to the National Register of Historic Places in 1993.
