= Nemacolin, Pennsylvania =

Unincorporated community in Pennsylvania, US

- Census-designated place
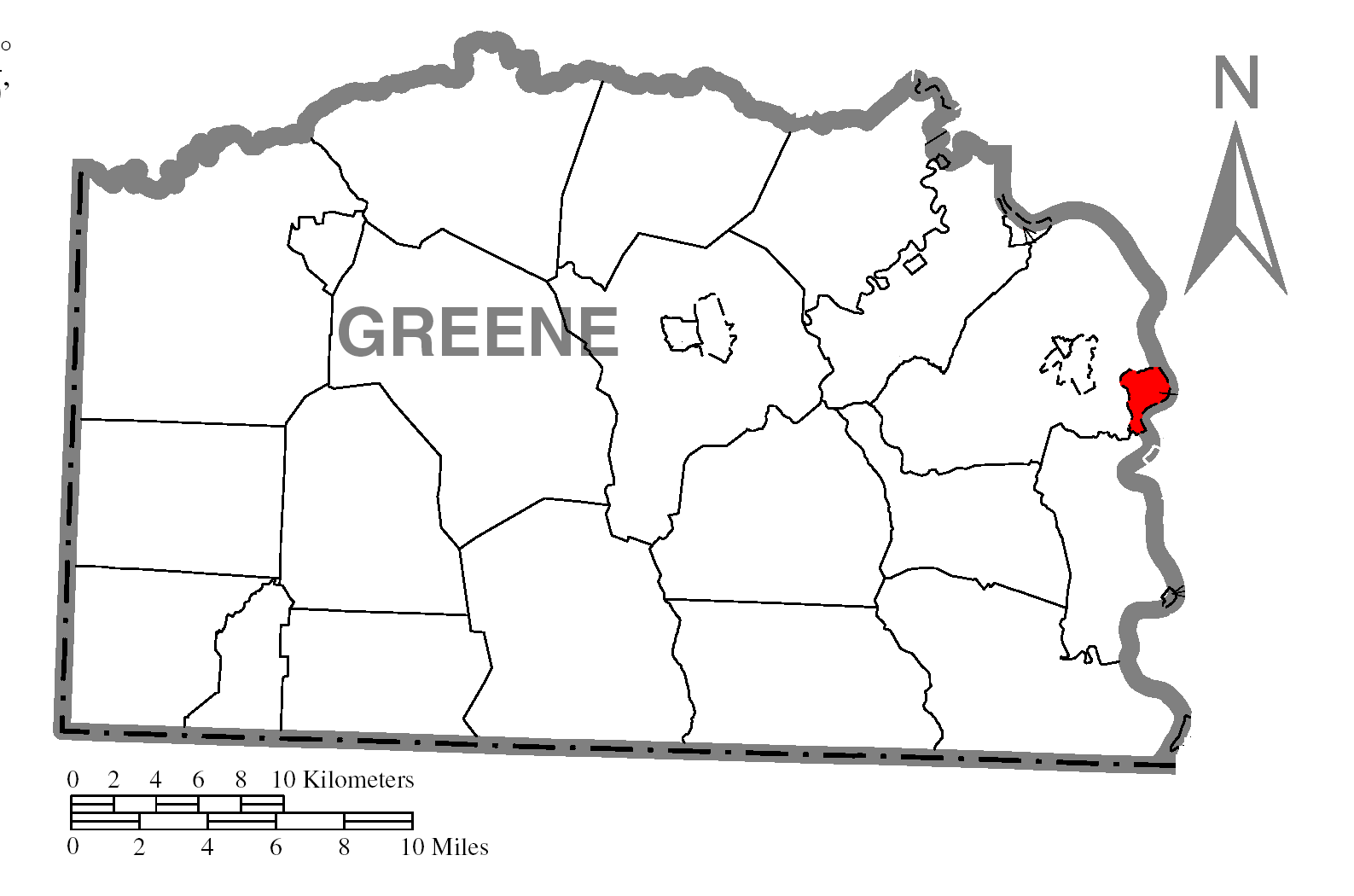
- Location of Nemacolin in Greene County
- Coordinates: 39°52′40″N 79°55′30″W
- Country: United States
- State: Pennsylvania
- County: Greene
- Township: Cumberland
- company town: 1917

Area
  - Total: 1.57 sq mi (4.07 km^{2})
  - Land: 1.43 sq mi (3.71 km^{2})
  - Water: 0.14 sq mi (0.36 km^{2})

Population (2020)
  - Total: 826
  - Density: 576.9/sq mi (222.75/km^{2})
- Time zone: UTC−4 (EST)
  - Summer (DST): UTC−5 (EDT)
- ZIP code: 15351
- Area code: 724
- FIPS code: 42-52968

Nemacolin is a census-designated place (CDP) in Greene County, Pennsylvania, United States. It was founded as a company town around the workings of a Youngstown Sheet and Tube Company that owned and operated a coal mine in 1917. The name reflects a noted Amerindian ally Chief Nemacolin, who showed the Virginia and Pennsylvania settlers how to cross the successive Allegheny barrier ridges via the Cumberland Narrows and the Nemacolin Trail—which Braddock Expedition widened into a wagon road through the mountains. The population of the CDP was 937 at the 2010 census.

== History ==
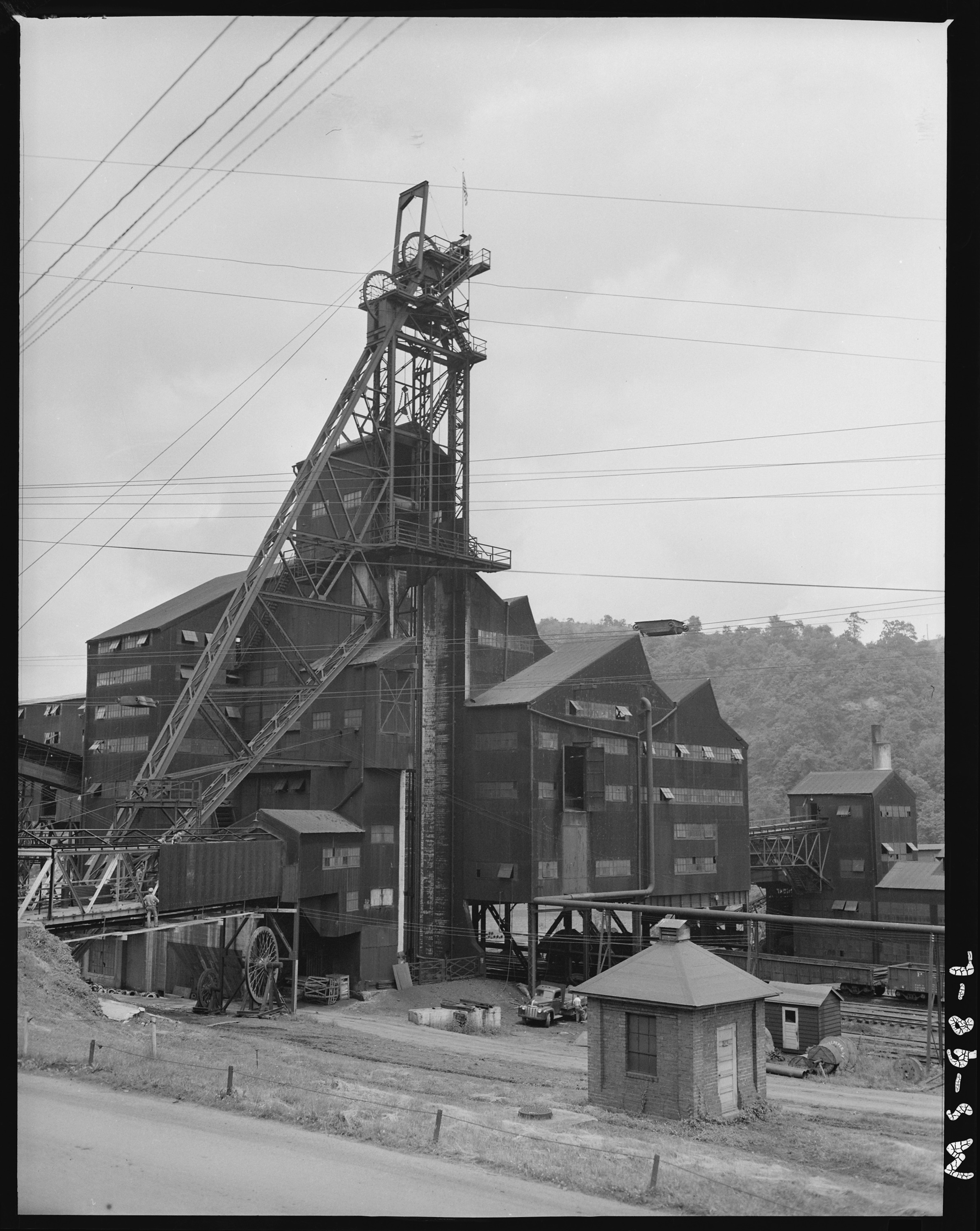
Buckeye Coal Company, 1946

The land upriver from Brownsville along the eastern border of Greene County was acquired by the Youngstown Sheet and Tube Co. (YS&T) which planned, zoned, populated, and built the community, complete with a movie theater, tennis courts, amusement hall (in the fashion of the times in blue-collar company towns, part pool hall, part beer garden), and swimming pool near the borough of Carmichaels. At one time, Youngstown Sheet and Tube was the largest steel company in the nation. Establishing the town well after the United Mine Workers flexed their muscles in the strikes of the 1890s–1900s and after its riot troubles in Youngstown in 1916, it is also likely the company had a hand in establishing the local school and one or more churches and likely issued invitations and recruited the medical practitioners operating various health clinics. (Note: The pleasant amenities might also have been a result of the 1916 riots the company experienced in its East Youngstown plant.)

The mine, established outside the town, was one of many large mines atop the Pittsburgh Coal Seam on the west bank of the Monongahela River. It was operated as a subsidiary under the Buckeye Coal Company which grew and benefited as being directly on the railroad route running upriver (south) to West Virginia and was able to load both river coal barges and freight trains with its output. It is thought by some to have been the largest coal mine in the United States in 1919, and was rated at being the second most productive in Greene County in the 1940s war years. The mine after operating for nearly 70 years, shut down production in 1986, and was sealed (safed) 2–3 years later.

== Geography ==
Nemacolin is located in the southeastern corner of Cumberland Township at 39°52′40″N 79°55′33″W (39.877676, −79.925858), on the west bank of the Monongahela River, which forms the eastern border of Greene County.

According to the United States Census Bureau, the CDP has a total area of 1.6 square miles (4.1 km^{2}), of which 1.4 square miles (3.7 km^{2}) is land and 0.1 square miles (0.3 km^{2}), or 8.57%, is water.

== Demographics ==
Historical population
Census	Pop.	Note	%±
2000	1,034		—
2010	937		−9.4%
2020	826		−11.8%
U.S. Decennial Census

As per the census of 2000, there were 1,034 people, 401 households, and 271 families residing in the CDP. The population density was 732.0 inhabitants per square mile (282.6/km^{2}). There were 451 housing units with an average density of 319.3 per square mile (123.3/km^{2}). The racial makeup of the CDP was 97.58% White, 0.48% African American, 0.19% Native American, and 1.74% from two or more races. Hispanic or Latino of any race were 1.45% of the population.

There were 401 households, out of which 34.9% had children under the age of 18 living with them, 42.6% were married couples living together, 17.5% had a female householder with no husband present, and 32.4% were non-families. 28.2% of all households were made up of individuals, and 16.0% had someone living alone who was 65 years of age or older. The average household size was 2.58 and the average family size was 3.13.

In the CDP, the population was spread out, with 28.8% under the age of 18, 7.7% from 18 to 24, 28.3% from 25 to 44, 20.9% from 45 to 64, and 14.2% who were 65 years of age or older. The median age was 33 years. For every 100 females, there were 92.9 males. For every 100 females age 18 and over, there were 85.4 males.

The median income for a household in the CDP was $23,458, and the median income for a family was $29,861. Males had a median income of $26,458 versus $25,972 for females. The per capita income for the CDP was $11,501. About 20.8% of families and 19.1% of the population were below the poverty line, including 27.8% of those under age 18 and 15.5% of those age 65 or over.

== Notable people ==
- Steve Popovich, record executive who launched the careers of The Jacksons, Cheap Trick, Bruce Springsteen, Southside Johnny & The Asbury Jukes, Bob Dylan, and Meat Loaf
- Richard Trumka, president of the AFL-CIO labor union
