= Little Meadows, Maryland =

Coordinates: 39°41′57″N 79°05′36″W

Little Meadows is located at the foot of Meadow Mountain in western Maryland. It was a common stopping point for British troops during the French and Indian War and was frequented by George Washington.

== George Washington and Little Meadows ==
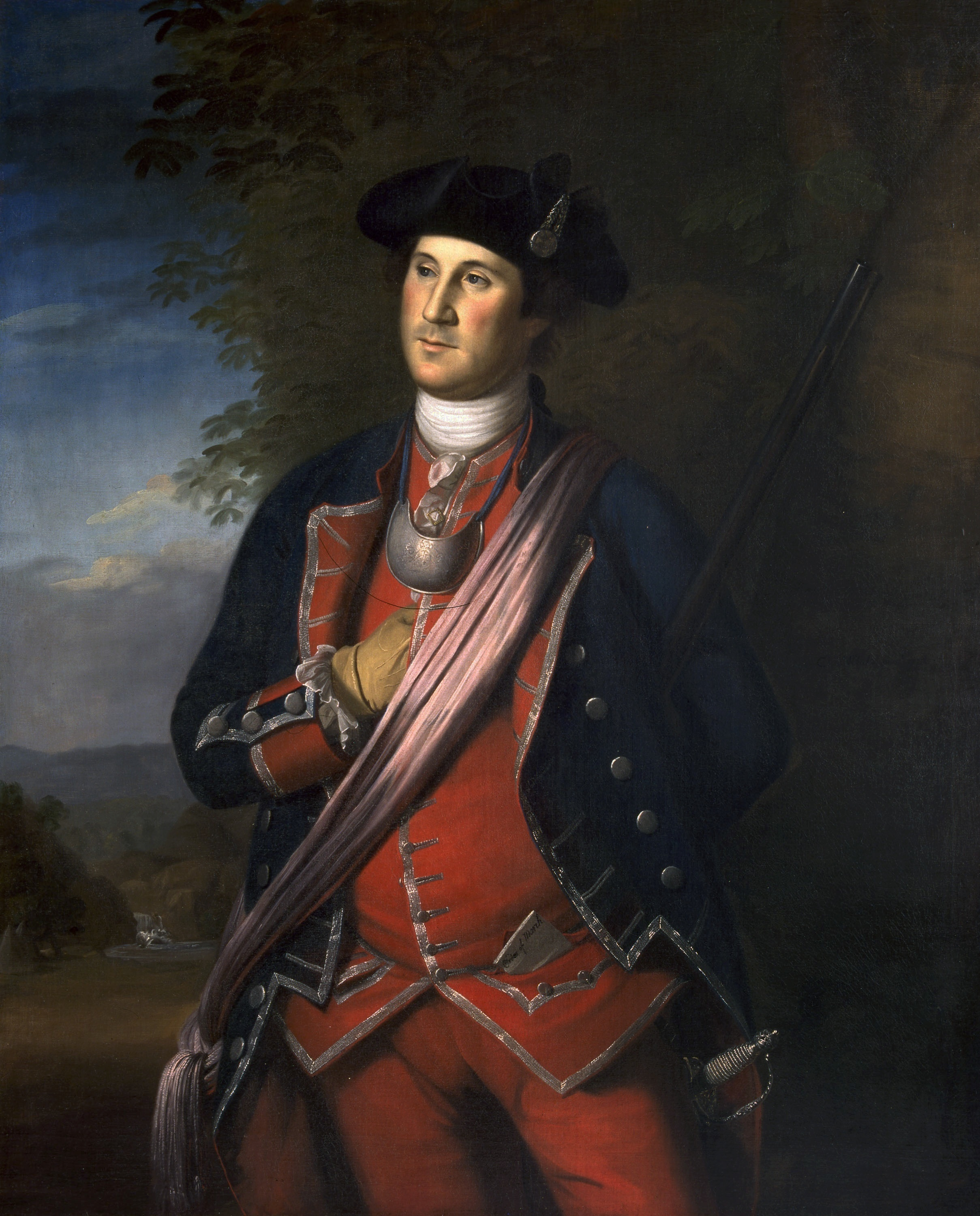
This, the earliest portrait of Washington, was painted in 1772 by Charles Willson Peale, and shows Washington in uniform as colonel of the Virginia Regiment.

After a failed attempt to ask the French to leave the Ohio territory in 1753, Governor Robert Dinwiddie sent Lieutenant Colonel George Washington of the new Virginia Regiment to drive out the French. Starting out from Wills Creek (now Cumberland, Maryland), the expedition stopped at Little Meadows in early May 1754 to make camp. Washington wrote Dinwiddie on May 9, commenting on the local terrain impeding their progress. Washington and his men moved on to ambush French forces and construct Fort Necessity, where they were eventually defeated and forced to return to Cumberland. The ambush and subsequent engagement proved to be a major spark of the French and Indian War, and the larger, worldwide, Seven Years' War.

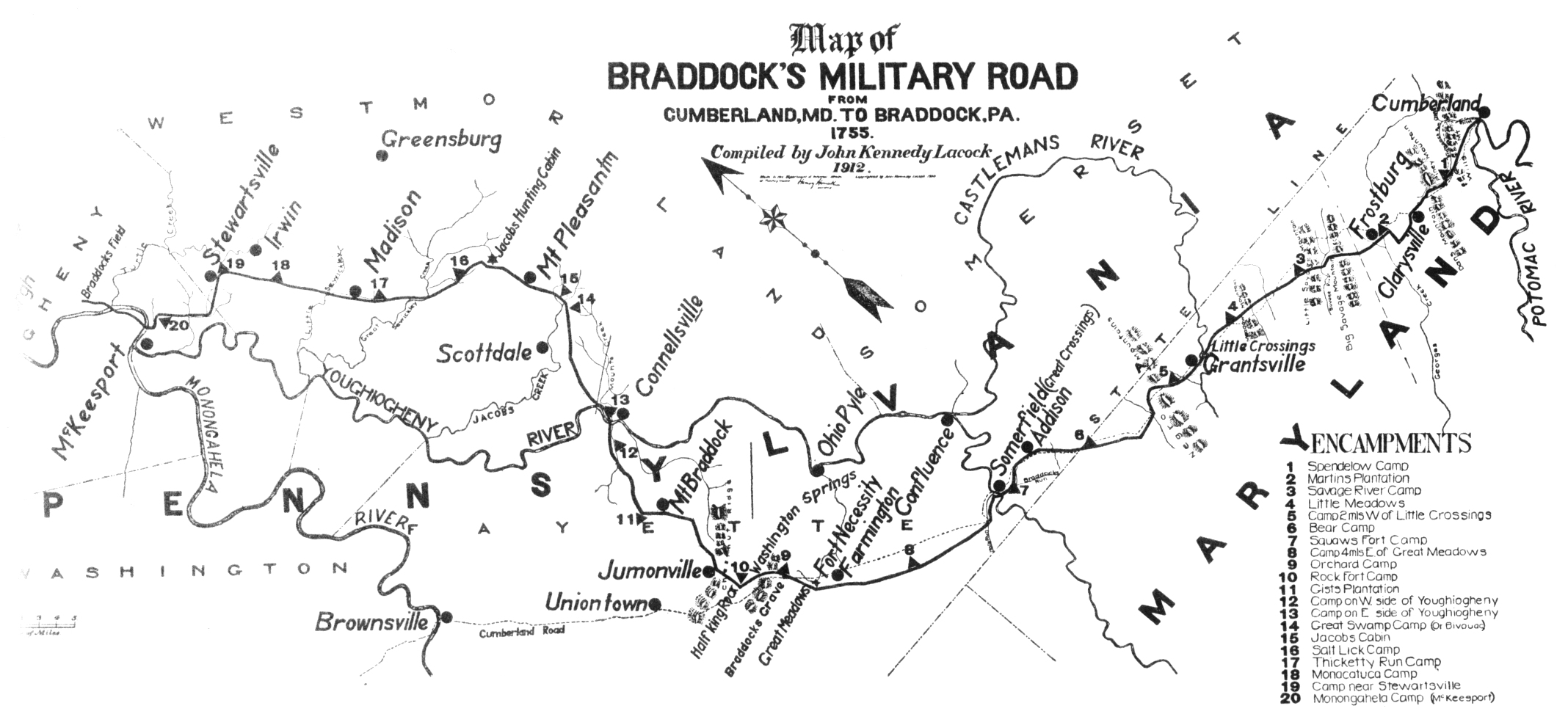
Map of Braddock's Military Road, showing nearby Grantsville. The number 4 indicates the camp at Little Meadows.

On June 10, 1755, British and American forces left Fort Cumberland, heading west. On the 16th they arrived at Little Meadows, where Sir John St. Clair had made a temporary camp. General Braddock, the overall British commander, was unaccustomed to frontier warfare and so asked Washington for advice, who made preparations to march on Fort Duquesne. While in camp the famous Captain Jack and his forest rangers, men who dressed in leather and cloth and operated as Indians offered their services to Braddock for intelligence and harassing enemy Indians. Braddock detested unconventional warfare and rebuffed their offer. On the 19th of June, Washington and 1,200 troops moved out, accompanied by their Indian allies, towards Fort Duquesne. General Braddock could not abandon the tactics of Europe, making slow progress on their march, only 12 miles in 4 days. As Washington put it, "instead of pushing on with vigor, without regarding a little rough road, they were halting to level every mole hill, and to erect bridges over every brook." Nine miles from Fort Duquesne, French and Indian forces attacked, eventually defeating the British and mortally wounding Braddock in what came to be known as the Battle of the Monongahela.
