= Fort Ashby, West Virginia =

CDP in the United States

- CDP
- Location within West Virginia Location within the United States
- Coordinates: 39°29′52″N 78°45′04″W
- Country: United States
- State: West Virginia
- County: Mineral
- Chartered: December 5, 1787
- Post office established: 1800
- Named for: Fort Ashby

Area
  - Total: 3.6 sq mi (9.2 km^{2})
  - Land: 3.6 sq mi (9.2 km^{2})
  - Water: 0.039 sq mi (0.1 km^{2})
- Elevation: 617 ft (188 m)

Population (2020)
  - Total: 1,289
  - Density: 360/sq mi (140/km^{2})
- Time zone: UTC-5 (Eastern (EST))
  - Summer (DST): UTC-4 (EDT)
- ZIP code: 26719
- Area code: 304
- FIPS code: 54-28444
- GNIS feature ID: 2389101

Fort Ashby is a census-designated place (CDP) in Mineral County, West Virginia, United States, along Patterson Creek. It is part of the Cumberland, MD-WV Metropolitan Statistical Area. The population was 1,289 at the 2020 census (down from 1,380 at the 2010 census). The community was originally chartered as Frankfort and then known as Alaska before it took the name of its well-known historic landmark. (Note: The post office for Fort Ashby was established in 1800 as Frankfort and it was subsequently renamed Alaska in 1881 and Fort Ashby in 1932. Fort Ashby was located in the U.S. state of Virginia until West Virginia's creation in 1863, and was located in Hampshire County until the establishment of Mineral County in 1866.) Fort Ashby is the location of the Mineral County Fair.

== Geography ==
According to the United States Census Bureau, the CDP has a total area of 9.2 km^{2} (3.6 sq mi), of which 9.2 km^{2} (3.6 sq mi) is land and 0.1 km^{2} (0.039 sq mi) (1.03%) is water.

== Demographics ==
At the 2000 census, there were 1,354 people, 574 households and 390 families residing in the CDP. The population density was 160.4 people/km^{2} (415 people/mi^{2}). There were 609 housing units at an average density of 72.1 units/km^{2} (187 units/mi^{2}). The racial makeup of the CDP was 98.82% White, 0.30% African American, 0.07% Native American, 0.30% Asian, 0.30% from other races, and 0.22% from two or more races. Hispanic or Latino of any race were 0.44% of the population.

There were 574 households, of which 29.6% had children under the age of 18 living with them, 56.8% were married couples living together, 8.2% had a female householder with no husband present, and 31.9% were non-families. 27.5% of all households were made up of individuals, and 15.7% had someone living alone who was 65 years of age or older. The average household size was 2.36 and the average family size was 2.87.

23.3% of the population were under the age of 18, 7.2% from 18 to 24, 28.2% from 25 to 44, 25.1% from 45 to 64, and 16.2% who were 65 years of age or older. The median age was 39 years. For every 100 females, there were 94.3 males. For every 100 females age 18 and over, there were 90.8 males.

The median household income was $32,375 and the median family income was $40,847. Males had a median income of $34,375 compared with $21,667 for females. The per capita income for the CDP was $15,114. About 4.9% of families and 8.8% of the population were below the poverty line, including 10.6% of those under age 18 and 13.8% of those age 65 or over.

== Education ==
Fort Ashby is part of Mineral County Schools. Fort Ashby has Fort Ashby Primary School and Frankfort Intermediate School (originally Fort Ashby High School until Frankfort High opened its door in 1976).

In 2024, the opening of Frankfort Elementary School in Short Gap closed the doors of Fort Ashby Primary and Intermediate Schools, along with Wiley Ford Primary School.

== History ==
=== Earliest inhabitants ===
Native Americans were known to have made many incursions into the Patterson Creek Valley in which nestles the quiet village of Fort Ashby. Shawnee warriors claimed sections of the lower valley as choice camping grounds on which they stopped and rested in going to and from their great hunts.

There are at least two distinctly well defined Native American trails leading into the community. One, from the North Branch Potomac River, across the mountain into Short Gap, also used later by George Washington when crossing the mountains, and the other coming in from Dan's Run over Valley Ridge.

There are many Native American graves around Fort Ashby in different places where small skirmishes are supposed to have taken place. Native Americans first interred in what is now the Fort Ashby Community Cemetery, or somewhere near. There is scarcely a spot in the community outside the immediate village where some visible trace of the Native American has not been found, and in several places within the limits of the community, darts and arrowheads can be picked up in small quantities.

Native American activities in Fort Ashby seem to have been centered against the early white settlers. Tribal differences of various natures seem to have been few and easily settled so that the combined efforts of all was directed toward keeping out the 'pale face' who was ruining the hunting ground.

All during the period of agitation between the French and Indian and American Revolutionary Wars the families of Frankfort, as it was then referred, seem to have been jeopardized by the French and Native Americans from the Ohio River Valley.

=== 18th century ===
The first fort at the confluence of the Monongahela and Allegheny rivers was built by men from Hampshire County, West Virginia. Part of these men came from the Frankfort District along Patterson Creek, likely Frankfort, as it was more thickly settled than any other section at that time. Captain William Trent was in command of the company. He did not finish the fort, however, as the French captured it before completion and named it Fort Duquesne.

Colonel Joshua Fry took command of part of Trent's men and came back with them east of Uniontown, Pennsylvania, where they started to build Fort Necessity. After Frye died during the construction, George Washington finished the fort.

About the year 1755 or 1756, the old Native American Chief Killbuck with his warriors from Muskingum River Valley, Ohio, came across the Allegheny Mountains and attacked the settlers in Patterson Creek Valley. It was on this expedition that Killbuck became prominent by his bloody murder of Williams and Wendell Miller. The carrying away of John Casey also occurred at the same time.

In 1755, Colonel George Washington gave orders to build a stockade and fort on the eastern side of Patterson Creek. This was built at the present site of Fort Ashby village and it is now a museum run by Friends of Ashby's Fort. Initially, the fort had a garrison of sixty men.

On Christmas Day 1755, Captain Charles Lewis of Fredericksburg took command of the fort and a garrison of twenty-one men. He had orders from Colonel Washington to remain quiet as long as he could and to hold the fort as long as possible, but if necessary rather than surrender it to burn it and try to get to Fort Sellars, located on the east side of the mouth of Patterson Creek, or to Fort Cumberland.

In 1756, Washington ordered Colonel Adam Stephen at Fort Cumberland to keep forts Ashby and Sellars completely supplied with food and ammunition. The only really important battle at Fort Ashby occurred in 1756 when Lieutenant Robert Rutherford and his company of rangers was defeated there by a band of French and Native Americans. After the French had gone from the vicinity the Native Americans remained watching for the inmates of the fort. It was during this siege that Colonel John Ashby, while out of the fort on what is now Cemetery Hill was attacked by the Native Americans and made a most remarkable escape to the fort. It is from this incident that the name of "Ashby's Fort" was applied. Colonel Ashby was later put in command of the fort and seems to have remained there until the Revolutionary War or after.

On April 22, 1756, Washington wrote to Ashby that if he was attacked by Native Americans to wait for the cover of darkness then blow up the fort and retreat to Fort Cumberland, taking what ammunition they could.

In the same year he wrote to Lieutenant Governor Robert Dinwiddie of Virginia as follows: "The people are all leaving the section around Frankfort in fear of the Indians and fear that in a short time it will be as desolate as all Hampshire County." Since there is a lapse of about two years for which no records of any kind have been found it is presumed that practically all settlers were driven out of what is now Mineral County except those who were protected by forts Ashby and Sellars.

In a later letter to Lieutenant Governor Dinwiddie, Washington said: "The men I hired to bring intelligence from the South Branch returned last night with letters from Captain Ashby and other parties there. The Indians have gone. It is believed their numbers were, about one hundred and fifty, that about seventy men are killed or missing and that several houses and plantations were destroyed. I shall proceed by quick marches to Fort Cumberland to strengthen the garrison there. Besides this I think it is absolutely necessary to have two or three companies of rangers to guard the Potomac waters. Captain Wagner informs me that it was with difficulty that he passed the Blue Ridge as crowds of people were fleeing as if a lost moment would mean death. He endeavored to stop them, but in vain, as they believed that all homes were in flames." Captain Wagner was a citizen of Frankfort.

It is really a question as to whether or not the first settlers of Frankfort community may have laid claim to the land of that immediate vicinity even before the Native Americans became much interested in it. It is known that white settlers came into the Patterson Creek Valley around Frankfort between the years 1732 and 1736. The names of Casey, Pancake, Foreman, and Van Meter were familiar before the prominence of George Washington. Following the grant of land, from the British Crown to Thomas Fairfax, 6th Lord Fairfax of Cameron known as the Northern Neck of Virginia, some settlers may have come to Frankfort as renters. Before Washington's survey, however, the immediate land around the village had been taken by people on the grounds of the Tomahawk Claim.

In his journals of "My Journeys Across the Mountain," Washington said that he stayed all night on March 28, 1748, with Abram Johnson on Patterson Creek, and on the following day, marched fifteen miles (24 km) to one Solomon Hedges, and when he came to supper, on the table was neither cloth, nor knife, nor fork. Abram Johnson lived a short distance south of Frankfort village.

Up until the time of the American Revolutionary War there does not seem to have been very many new families moving into the lower part of the Valley. The Johnsons and Van Meters seem to have been the leading citizens and largest land owners. Just about the beginning of the War, however, new names became prominent in the community; among them are Tay-lor, Lynn, Williams, and Powell.

We find that history records very little about Frankfort with regard to the American Revolutionary War. That entire section of country bordering on the Potomac and Monongahela rivers was known as the back door of the Revolution. Frankfort was right in the heart of this section. The reason why we see so little mentioned from this section of Virginia in the story of the Revolution is that the men were kept busy watching the Indians.

In 1777, Captain William Foreman gathered together from Hampshire County a company of men to keep down the Native Americans who had been agitated by the British. He marched with them to Wheeling and there met the Native Americans at the McMechen Narrows where he was defeated. A monument now marks the spot where Foreman's defeat occurred on WV 28 between Springfield and Romney. Men from Frankfort who were in Foreman's Company were Samuel Johnson, John Willison, and William Lynn.

Captain Michael Cresap who lived in Oldtown, Maryland across from Green Spring, came over into Hampshire County during the early part of the Revolution and organized a company of riflemen. They marched to Boston and featured in several small skirmishes there. Cressap returned with them as far as New York where he died and was buried. The men in this company from Frankfort include the names of Johnson, Ashby, Wagoner, Williams, Powell, Pew, Harris, and Miller. Cresaptown, Maryland is named for him.

Immediately after the close of the war, Frankfort seems to have developed rapidly. Many new settlers came, including the names of Keller, Richards, Brockhart, and Daniels. It was about this time that the brick house now occupied by Mrs. Blanche Welker and also the old stone hotel were built. Both buildings were used as hotels, replacing the old roadhouse which was located near where Charles Pyles now lives, and the tavern at Short Gap, to some extent.

=== Establishment of Frankfort ===
Through the influence of several men of the village, particularly Dennis Daniels, one hundred and thirty-nine acres of land belonging to John Kellar was surveyed into town lots with streets and alleys running between. A charter was passed through the Virginia General Assembly on December 5, 1787, a copy of which follows:

1. Be it enacted by the general assembly, that one hundred and thirty-nine acres of land, in the county of Hampshire, the property of John Kellar, and laid off by him into in and out lots, with convenient streets, shall be, and the same is hereby established, a town by the name of Frankfort, and that John Mitchell, Andrew Cooper, Ralph Humphries, John Williams, Sen. James Clark, Richard Stafford, Hezekiah Whiteman, and Jacob Brookhart, gentlemen, be trustees thereof, who, or the major part of them, shall have power, from time to time, to settle and determine all disputes concerning the bounds of said lots, and to establish such rules and regulations for the regular building of houses thereon, as to them shall seem best. In case of the death, resignation, removal out of the county, or other legal disability of one or more of the said trustees, it shall be lawful for the remaining trustees, to supply such vacancy, and the person so chosen shall have the same power as if he had been particularly named in this act.

2. And be it further enacted, that so many of the lots in the said town as are not sold by the said John Kellar are hereby vested in the said trustees, and they, or a majority of them, shall within six months after the passing of this act, sell the lots at public auction, having previously advertised the time and place of such sale at the court house of said county, on three successive court days, and convey the same to the purchaser in fee, subject to the conditions of building a house on each, sixteen feet square, with a brick or stone chimney, to be finished fit for habitation within three years from the date of sale, and pay the money arising from such sale to the said John Kellar, or his legal representatives. So soon as the purchaser of said lots shall have built thereon according to their respective deeds of conveyance, they shall then be entitled to, and have and enjoy all the rights, privileges, and immunities, which the freeholder and inhabitants of other towns in this state, not incorporated, hold and enjoy. If the purchaser of any lot sold by the said trustees shall fail to build thereon within the time limited, it shall be lawful for the said trustees, or a majority of them, to enter into such lot, sell the same again, and apply the money for the benefit of the inhabitants of the said town.

=== Early commerce ===
Some of the lots were sold and built upon according to the provisions of the charter. Many were not sold in the time provided but later were sold at public auction under a deed of trust. They were bought by Joseph Inskeep who still had hopes that the city of Frankfort would mature. Inskeep was so strong in his belief that he donated four lots in the center of the village to be used for the good of the public when the city did develop. This tract is known today, as the Public Square.

From the time of the establishment of the town of Frankfort for many years this was the trading center of the entire country side. Before the completion of the Baltimore and Ohio Railroad Frankfort was on the direct route from Winchester to Wheeling over which hundreds of tons of merchandise passed monthly. It was the long wagon trains passing over this route that furnished business for two hotels in Frankfort. Many times has the Public Square been crowded overnight with canvas covered wagons loaded with valuable merchandise.

Samuel Brady was probably the first merchant of any importance in Frankfort. He operated a large chain of stores, one of which was located here years before the American Civil War. It is said that almost any article asked for could be bought there. People are known to have traded with him regularly from Keyser and above and also from what is now Ridgeley when the North Branch Potomac River could not be forded to Cumberland.
