= Thomas Brown (businessman) =

American colonial era husbandman, businessman, and land speculator

Thomas Brown (1738 – March 8, 1797) was an American colonial era husbandman, businessman, and land speculator. Along with his brother Basil, he acquired the bulk of the (Brownsville) lands towards the end of the American Revolution from Thomas Cresap (Note: Colonel Cresap had worked with Delaware Chief Nemacolin and a small crew (under contract with the Ohio Company in 1848-1853) trying to widen and improve what became Braddock's military road down to the ford at 'Redstone Old Fort' precisely to the lands Cresap sold to the Browns. When Braddock's Road reached (today's) Uniontown, it diverged following a different set of Amerindian trails to head northwest while Nemacolin Trail (became Burd's Road to Brownsville) headed to the ford at Brownsville. The Ohio Company had settled a large grant on Cresap, who'd also founded Oldtown, Maryland athwart the Nemacolin Trail about 1741. Whether he was independent fleeing the situation along the Conejohela Valley, or had been dispatched by Lord Baltimore is moot—from 1841 onward he had a hand in developing the route over the mountains and the Ohio River Basin.)(Cresap's War, Lord Dunmore's War), early enough to sell plots to Jacob Bowman in 1780 and Jacob Yoder who respectively made business firsts in 1780 and 1782; Jacob Bowman founded a trading post and tavern. Yoder got in a crop big enough to ship to New Orleans and invented the flat boat on Redstone Creek, inaugurating the water craft construction businesses which made the town an industrial powerhouse for the next seventy years.

When Brown traveled to or actually purchased the lands is murky, but it is accepted he formally founded the town of Brownsville, Pennsylvania in 1785, and he was further documented as personally laying out plots and boundaries himself at the age of 47 in that same year then advertising them for sale 'back east'. Based on his sales to Bowman and Yoder, he apparently had been selling lots for all the 1780s, before 1785.

His lands were in the area generally called Redstone or Redstone Fort or Redstone Old Fort or sometimes (Note: ... sometimes the newer Fort Burd (built 1859, used again 1774)) Fort Burd (from construction in 1759).

The first flat boat (1782), and in 1811, the first steamboats on North America's inland rivers —among thousands and hundreds of others until well into the 1850s— were built in the town.

Brown died in 1797 and is interred in the Christ Church church yard in Brownsville.

== Thinking forward ==
Brown could not anticipate that his town would become the major steamboat construction center on the Mississippi watershed, but was arguably a forward thinker, a man forward thinking enough that he acted before the early 1780s—whilst the Indian threat was diminishing but still very real, and the French-Canadians were a similar but more remote threat— to realize the land at the Monongahela crossing ford of The Nemacolin Trail would be a valuable parcel. Unlike many others, he was not enticed by the many flatter better farmland plots available to the west now that the west side foothills and rivers were the last obstacles to travel.

Across was a complex of ancient Native American trails that foot traffic and mule trains could use heading west. The Brownsville site was a rare low banked region along the length of the hills leading down river, and the end of the shortest Wagon Trail leading back over the pass to the east across the mountain barrier range. The main Nemacolin trail lead west across mostly dry footing into the Ohio Country—and reached another wider river crossing near today's Wheeling, West Virginia on the Ohio. Either the preferred switch to traveling on the river or the trails would bottleneck settlers at Fort Burd and so offered great opportunities to outfit them on their westward trek. The booming businesses of Brownsville and surrounding communities did precisely that starting in 1782 (first flat boat built on Redstone Creek by ) even before Thomas Brown personally came west into the settlement and until sometime in the 1870s–1880s when large numbers of pioneers stopped taking boats to Missouri to connect with the California, Mormon, or Oregon Trails (Note: While some historians have dated the end use of the main Emigrant Trails to the far west academically and conveniently concurrent with the completion of the first Transcontinental railroad in 1869, this is a misleading accounting trick of historians. Wagons and Wagon Trains were within economic reach of far more people than were expensive railroad tickets (plus the cost of outfitting and buying goods and possessions), not to mention the problem of getting to a plot at trips end. Wagon travel and River boats were in use until well into the early twentieth-century, and the development of paved roadways demanded by a motorcar focused public.)

== See also ==
- History of Pennsylvania

== Notes ==
- Glen Tunney. "TOMBSTONE OF THE FOUNDER OF BROWNSVILLE MAY BE IN ERROR". rootsweb.ancestry.com (newspaper article reprint).
- Dan Visnauskas, Fayette County and Brownsville Historical Society. "A Brief History of Brownsville, Pa". Fayette Forward Commission.
- Hugh Rawson. "The French and Indian War (section)". the Brownsville Historical Society (published under the auspices of Nemacolin Castle).
