= Christ Church (Brownsville, Pennsylvania) =

Historic Anglican church in Brownsville, Pennsylvania, United States

Coordinates: 40°01′25″N 79°52′47″W

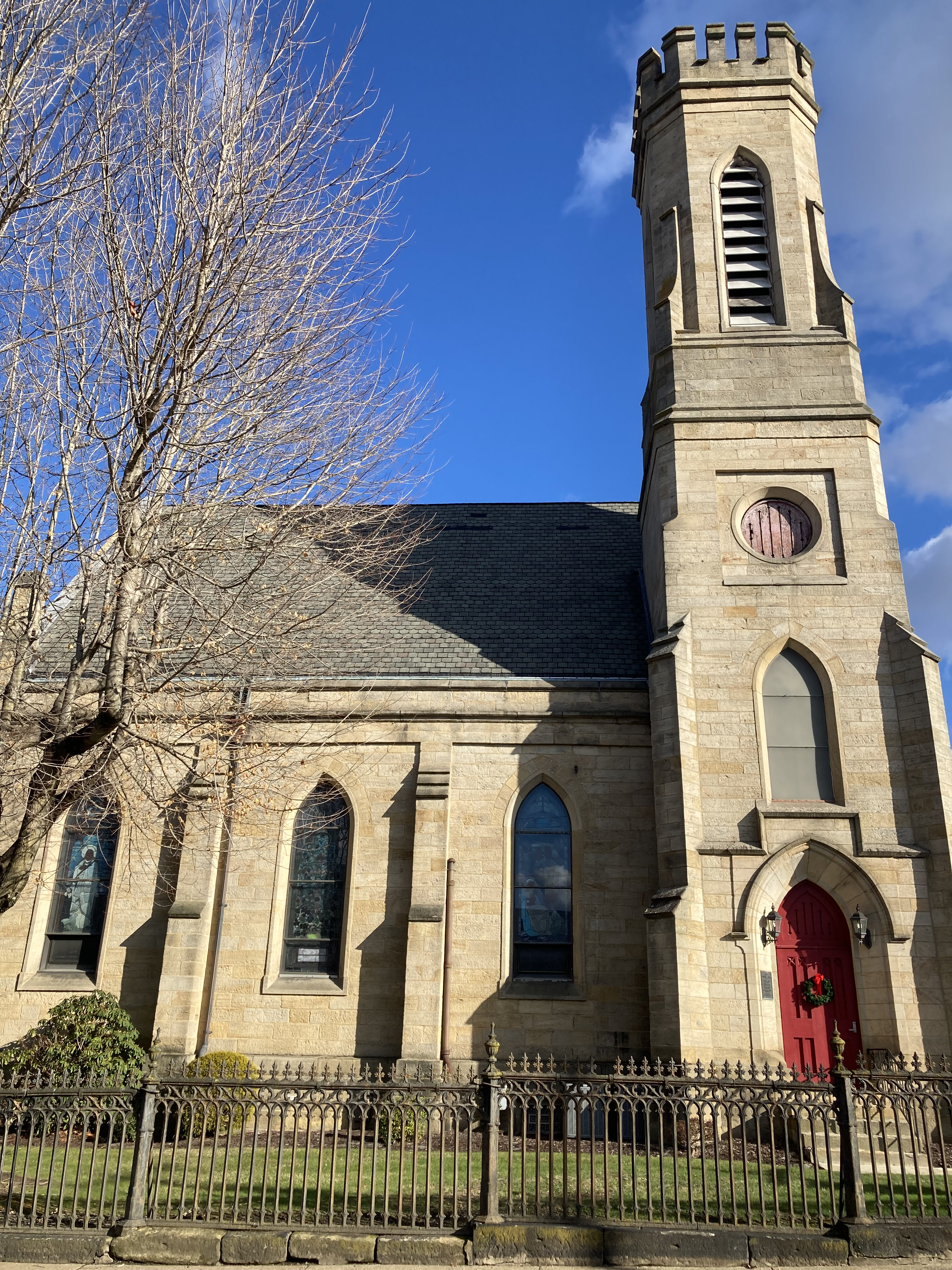
- Location: 319 Church Street, Brownsville, Pennsylvania
- Country: United States
- Denomination: Anglican Church in North America
- Website: https://www.christchurchbrownsville.org/

History
- Founded: 1813
- Dedicated: 1859

Architecture
- Style: Gothic Revival
- Years built: 1857

Administration
- Diocese: Pittsburgh

Clergy
- Rector: Vacant
- Christ Episcopal Church
- U.S. Historic district – Contributing property
- Part of: Brownsville Northside Historic District (ID93000717)
- Added to NRHP: August 2, 1993

Christ Church is a historic Anglican church in Brownsville, Pennsylvania. Completed in 1857, the church is a contributing property to the Brownsville Northside Historic District.

== History ==
The congregation traces its origins to 1759, when Anglican services in what is present-day Brownsville were held by British troops establishing the Redstone Old Fort during the French and Indian War. The parish was formally recognized by the Diocese of Pennsylvania in 1813. Until the 1820s, Anglican worship took place quietly in private log churches along the National Pike amid anti-English prejudice. In 1796, Anglicans purchased the present-day grounds of the church for constructing a church in the newly established town of Brownsville. The first church was completed in 1823. and consecrated by Bishop William White in 1825. The second and present stone church was built in 1857 and consecrated in 1859, remaining in continual use since then.

In 2008, as part of the Anglican realignment, Christ Church joined the majority of the Episcopal Diocese of Pittsburgh in disassociating from the Episcopal Church and forming the Anglican Diocese of Pittsburgh under Bishop Robert Duncan.

== Architecture ==
Christ Church's present building was designed in the Gothic Revival style and built of cut sandstone. The church features a crenellated bell tower on its southern corner along with a steeply pitched slate roof, three window bays on each side featuring stained glass tracery windows, stone buttresses and a chancel.

Next to the church is a two-story, five-bay vernacular brick house that once served as the Christ Church rectory and is currently used for offices and classrooms. According to the National Register of Historic Places nomination form, "The former parsonage has a stone foundation, a shingles-clad gable roof with double chimneys and curtains at gable ends, and a center Greek Revival doorway surrounded by sidelights, transom and a large, flat, stone lintel." Across the street is a stone parish hall built in 1873; it also has a steeply pitched slate roof and Gothic windows with an adjacent 1908 addition.

== Cemetery ==
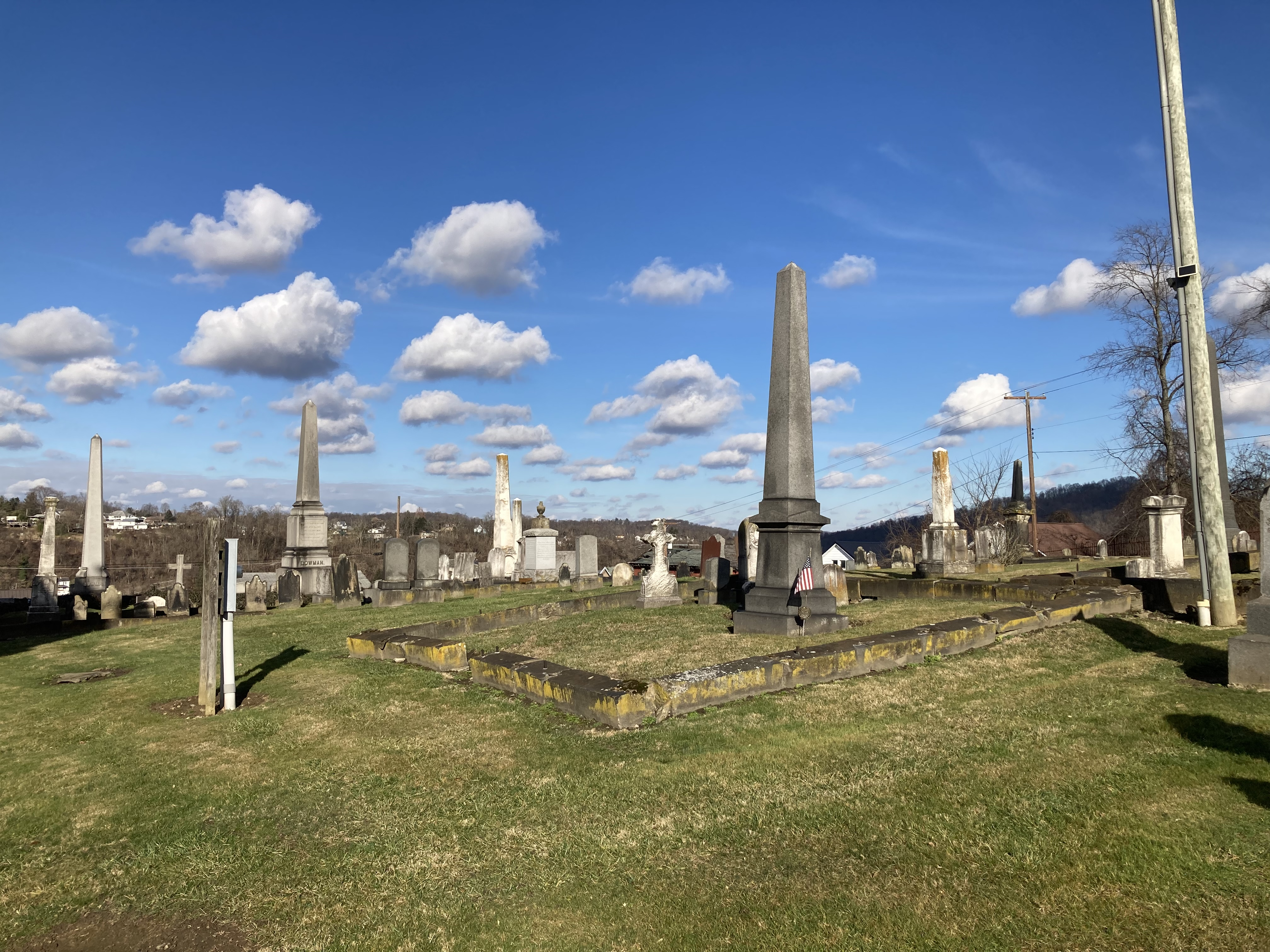
The Christ Church, Brownsville, church yard.

The Christ Church cemetery is located directly northeast of the church and is surrounded by an iron picket fence. Notable burials in the cemetery include Thomas Brown, the founder of Brownsville and Jacob Bowman, Brownsville businessman and early senior warden of Christ Church.

== Ministries ==
Christ Church holds weekly Eucharistic services, Bible studies and various outreach ministries.
