= Emmanuel Episcopal Church (Cumberland, Maryland) =

Church building in Cumberland, Maryland, United States

Coordinates: 39.651°N 78.7654°W

The Emmanuel Episcopal Church of Cumberland, Maryland in Cumberland's Historic District is built on the foundations of Fort Cumberland, where George Washington began his military career; earthworks from the fort (built in 1755) still lie beneath the church. Although the Emmanuel parish dates from 1803, the cornerstone of the current native sandstone building was laid in 1849 and completed in 1851. The church contains original Tiffany stained-glass windows from three different periods and a scale model of Fort Cumberland. The grounds are part of the Fort Cumberland Walking Trail, signposted with plaques and detailed in a leaflet available from the visitor center.

Standing at the eastern end of the Washington Street Historic District, it is one of Maryland's examples of early Gothic Revival architecture. The church is on the former site of Fort Cumberland, and earthwork tunnels remaining from the fort run under the church. The church was constructed around 1850 and designed by Philadelphia architect John Notman. It is modeled after St. Paul's Church in Brighton, England. The design is typical ecclesiastical architecture of the second quarter of the 19th century, especially that of the Episcopal Church.

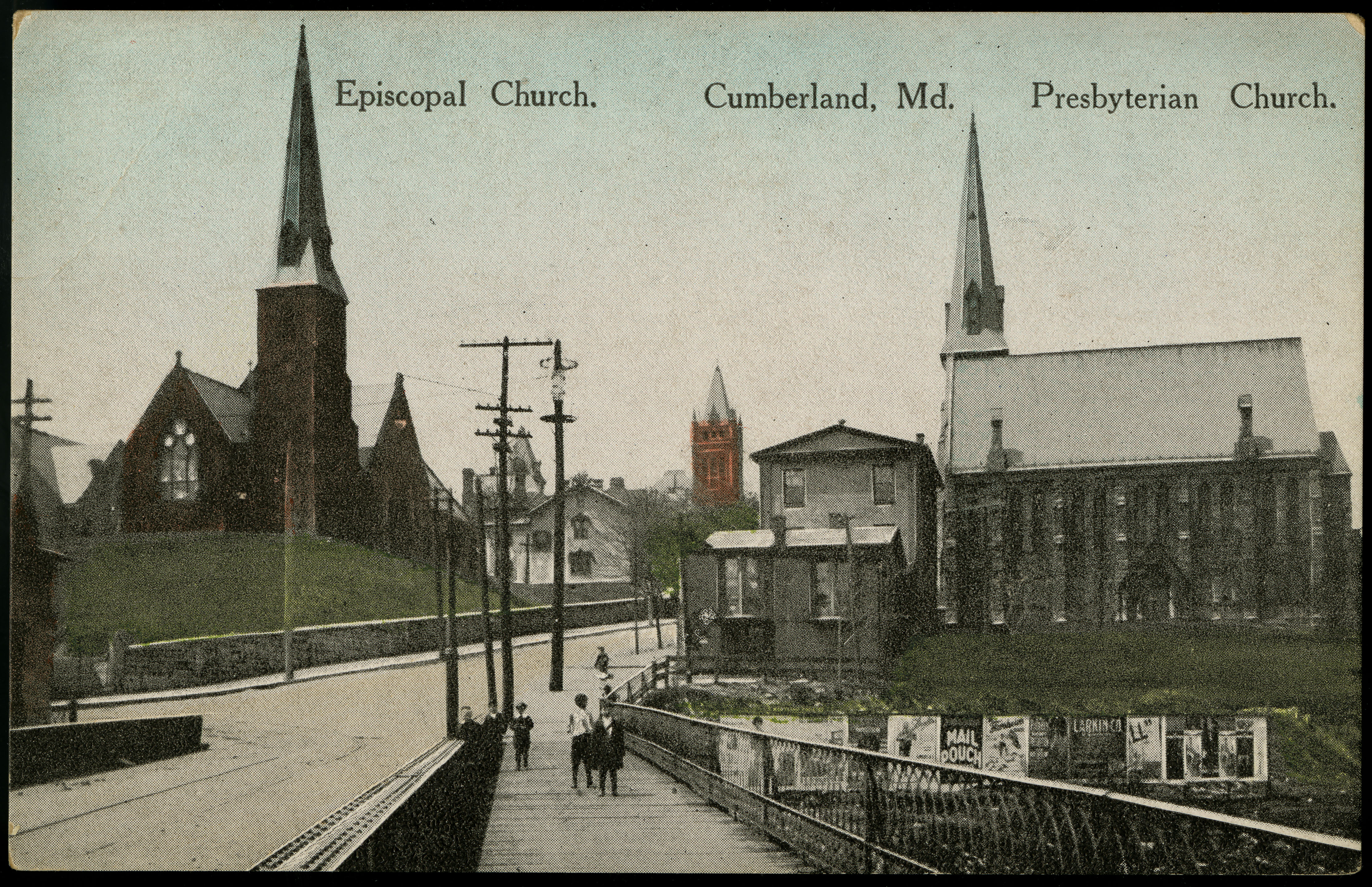
Emmanuel Episcopal Church and the First Presbyterian Church on an old postcard

The Cumberland Parish House was built in 1903 and designed by Cumberland native Bruce Price. Price chose elements of the popular Second Empire style for the Parish House, an eclectic style based loosely on French architecture during the reign of Napoleon. The Parish house features elements typical of this style, such as a projecting pavilion, tall windows and roof, and deep architectural details. Many other houses of the Washington Street Historic District resemble the Parish House, but also feature a mansard roof, this style's central characteristic.

The church and parish house sit on land that was originally Fort Cumberland, which served as a frontier outpost during the French and Indian War. The only building to remain from the fort is the small cabin that was used by George Washington as his headquarters when he was in the Cumberland area with his Virginia troops. It has been moved to nearby Riverside Park.

Emmanuel Episcopal Church and Parish House are at 16 Washington Street and are contributing buildings to the Washington Street Historic District. Church services are open to the public, and the tunnels are open for tours during the Heritage Days festival in June.
