= John Ashby (militiaman) =

American colonel (1707–1789)

John Ashby (1707–1789) was a colonel in the Virginia militia and a frontiersman.

== Biography ==
John Ashby came from a family of pioneers. His father, Thomas Ashby, first settled in Stafford County, Virginia, in 1710, before moving to what is now Fauquier County in 1748. In 1741, John married Jean Combs from Maryland. From 1752 to 1754, Ashby served as captain of the 2nd Virginia Rangers. In 1752, he was elected to the Frederick Parish church council. In 1756, Ashby was attacked by Native Americans and escaped to the fort, which was later named after him—Fort Ashby. During the French and Indian War, there was a siege at present-day Fort Ashby, West Virginia. Ashby fought in the Battle of Point Pleasant in 1774.
