= St. Peter's Church (Brownsville, Pennsylvania) =

Historic church in Pennsylvania, United States

- The Historic Church of St. Peter Roman Catholic Church
- U.S. National Register of Historic Places
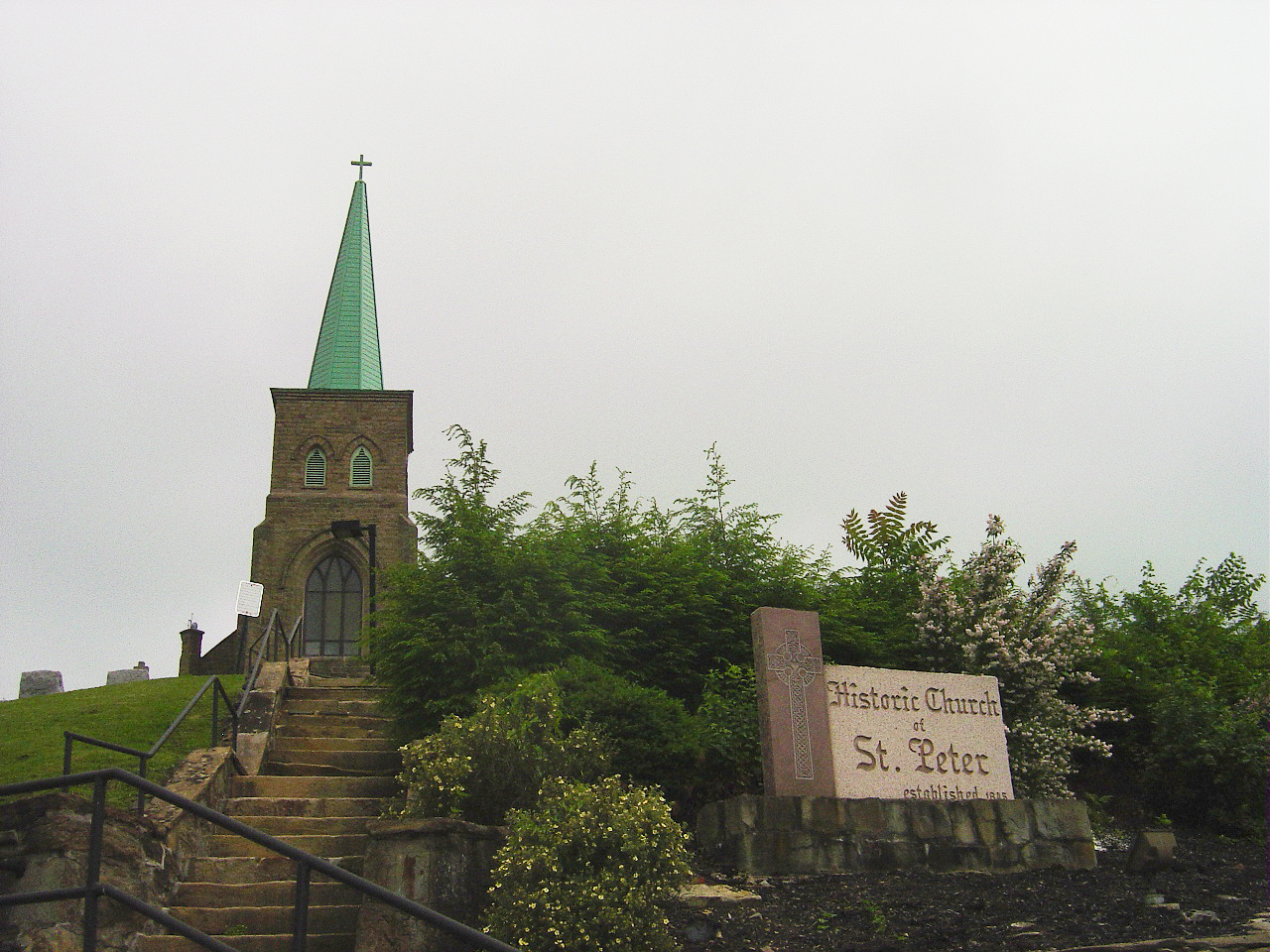
- The Historic Church of St. Peter as seen from Church Street, Brownsville, Pennsylvania, June 2009

- Location within Pennsylvania Location within the United States
- Location: Church St., Brownsville, Pennsylvania
- Coordinates: 40°1′21″N 79°52′39″W
- Area: 0.8 acres (0.32 ha)
- Built: 1843
- Architect: Mr. Crisp
- Architectural style: Gothic Revival
- NRHP reference No.: 80003494
- Added to NRHP: October 15, 1980

The Historic Church of St. Peter is a Roman Catholic church in Brownsville, Pennsylvania, in the Diocese of Greensburg. The Historic Church of St. Peter also has a partner parish in Grindstone, Pennsylvania named St. Cecilia's Roman Catholic Church, which was built in 1931.

== Description ==
The first Catholic parish in Fayette County, it is the oldest continuously operating parish in Western Pennsylvania. It is also believed to have been the spot on which the first religious service of any kind offered west of the Allegheny Mountains was held. On July 1, 1754, French troops on their way to capture Fort Necessity from the British climbed the bank from the Monongahela River with their Chaplain Rev. Denys Baron and prayed for victory. That mass of the French troops is depicted in one of the stained glass windows in the church.

The stone Gothic Revival church building on Church Street is a landmark. It was added to the National Register of Historic Places in 1980. It is located in the Brownsville Northside Historic District. At the time when the church was built, many European settlers where moving their way into the area. The Catholic Irish settlers decided to build a church the same as other religious groups in the area. To show wealth and power, they decided to build a church overlooking the town that could be seen from almost any perspective. To tie in the local history of the area, they built the church of rough river rock and depicted the French and Indian War in the stained glass window at the anterior of the church. The stained glass windows, which feature 32 different shades of blue depict Catholic history from 1754 to 1843.

The church was established in 1843 to serve the burgeoning Irish American population. At the time, Brownsville was an important gateway to the West and South due to its location on the National Road, and believing it, not Pittsburgh, would become the seat of the episcopal see, the founders built the church to be a future cathedral. The pulpit is located to the left of the altar, as in a cathedral, and the crypt includes space for the tombs of bishops.

== Cemetery ==
Another unique feature of The Historic Church of St. Peter is its cemetery. In addition to its unique inscriptions on the headstone, the Cemetery has been featured in Ripley's Believe It or Not as the only cemetery with heated graves. The boiler that heated the church was located in a separate building across the street and the pipes running under the cemetery to the church created a significant enough amount of heat to even melt snow on several grave sites.

=== Notable Burials ===
- Parents of James G. Blaine, a West Brownsville native who was a U. S. Senator and Secretary of State and narrowly lost the 1884 United States presidential election to Grover Cleveland

== Gallery ==
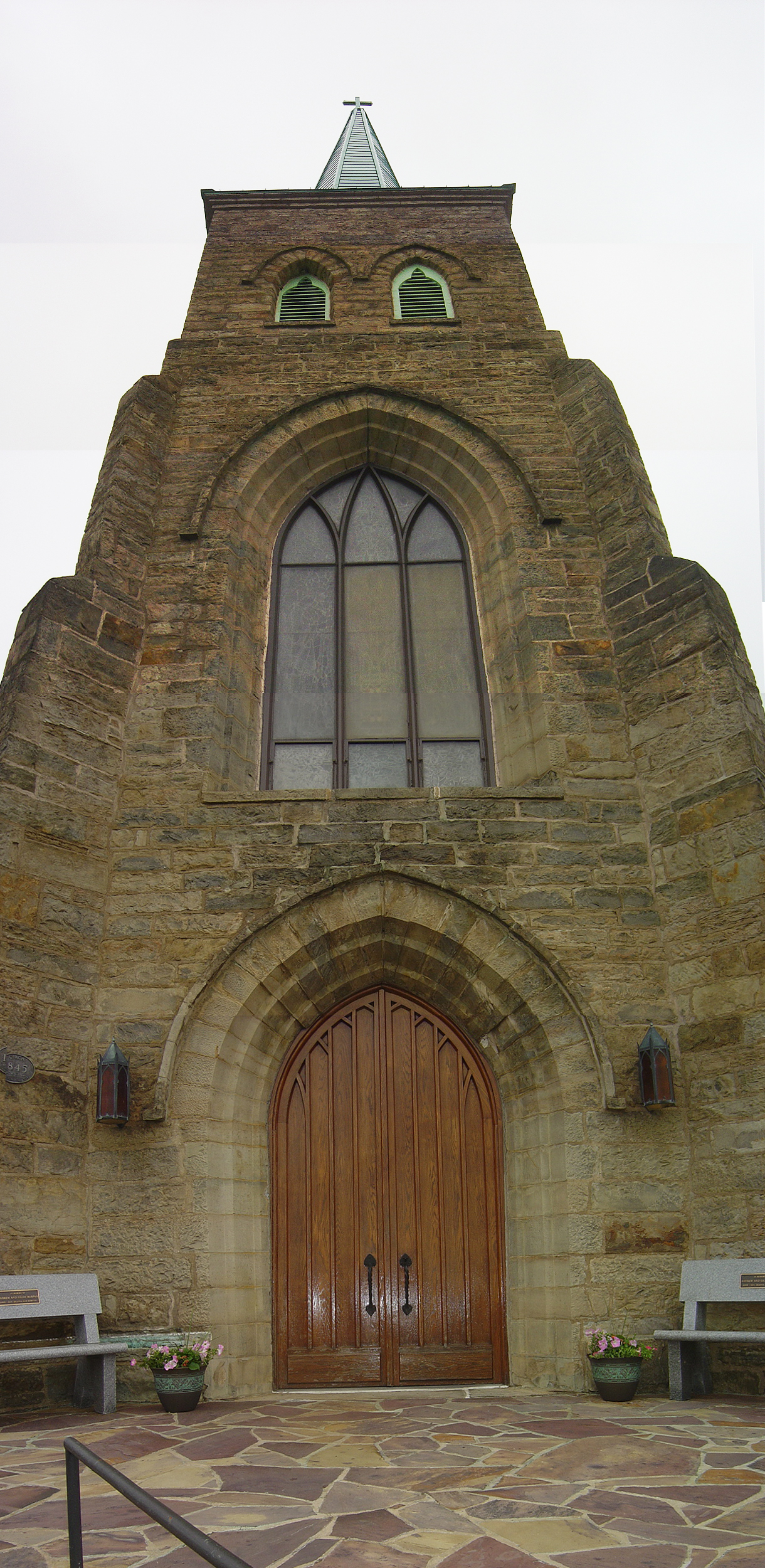
The entrance to St. Peter's Church in Brownsville, Pennsylvania

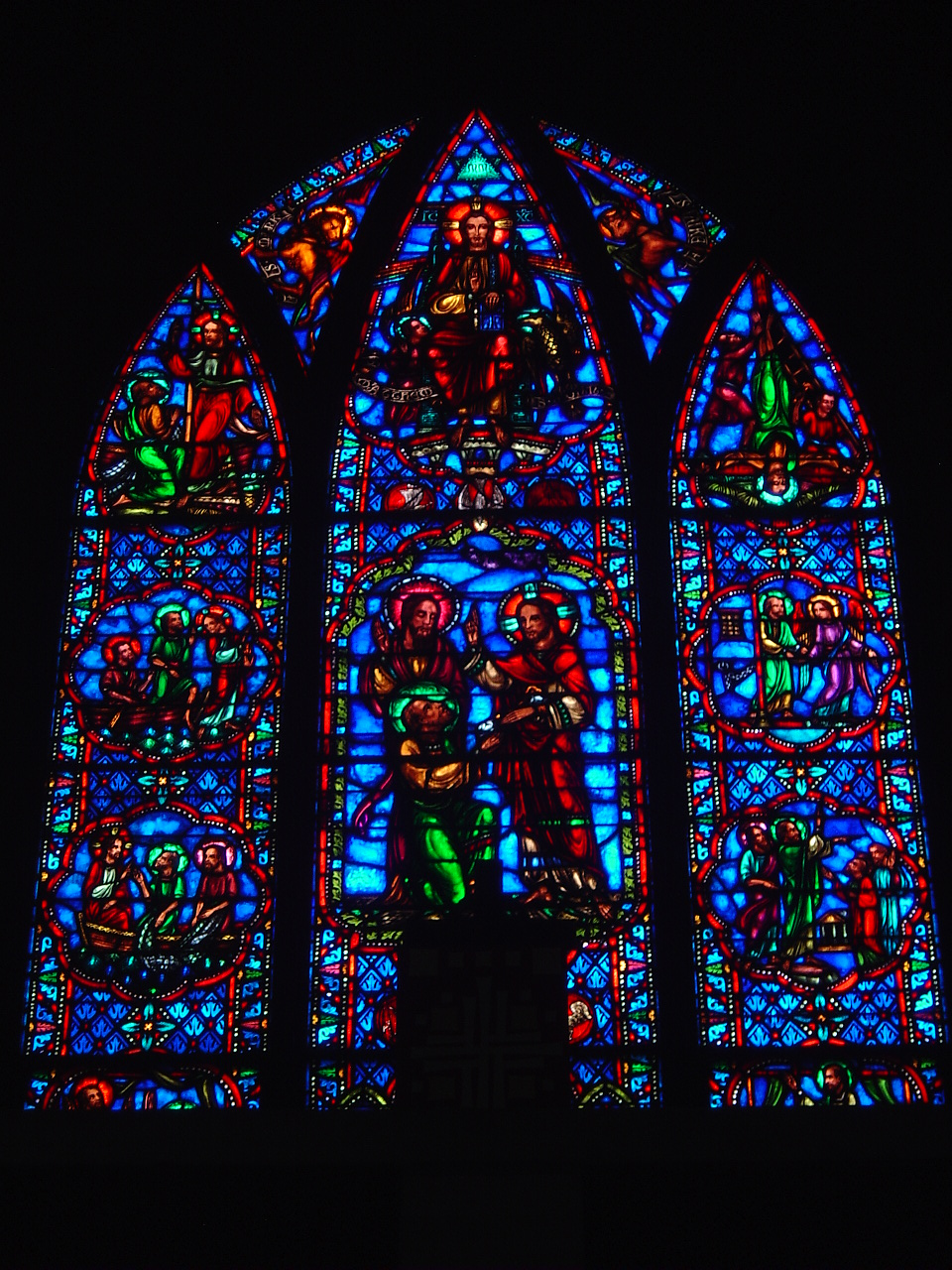
The stained glass window behind the altar inside St. Peter's Catholic Church in Brownsville, Pennsylvania
