= Fort Ohio =

1749 stockade fort in what is now West Virginia, US

Coordinates: 39°38′50″N 78°46′00″W

Fort Ohio (also known as the "New Store") was a stockade fort erected by Job Pearsall in 1749 on the present site of Ridgeley, West Virginia. The building was of log construction, 45 feet (14 m) long and 25 feet (7.6 m) wide, with two stories. Its name comes from the Ohio Company which did have a trading post at that location. The Ohio Company found success because a trail across the Allegheny Mountains from the Potomac River at Cumberland to near modern-day Pittsburgh offered a direct route to the Ohio River.

== Buildings ==
The building contained a garret and dry cellar, used for the storage of furs, the size of the structure itself. The building also contained living quarters for a trader by the name of Hugh Parker. A few years later another building, much of the same structure, was built near the original storage building, also with a garret and cellar. A stable, meat house and dairy were also constructed close to the main building, all fortified by Governor Dinwinddie of Virginia. Fort Ohio was one of a chain of four forts protecting the frontier. Fort Ohio was the first in the chain with Fort Sellers next, then Fort Ashby and Fort Cocke as the outermost forts. Fort Ohio was abandoned when Fort Cumberland was erected about 1754, directly across the river in Maryland. Fort Cumberland was, for its time and type, a large, elaborate fortification. Although originally built as a storage building for furs, it was converted to a blockhouse on September 7, 1754.

== Military involvement ==
New Store became an important role for the military on operations regarding the French and Indians early in the conflict. On September 7, 1754, Governor Dinwiddie wrote to Governor Sharpe of Maryland that he had ordered Colonel James Innis at Fort Cumberland to take possession of the Ohio Company's storehouse and to make a magazine out of it. Dinwiddie also reported that he had directed the building of a breastwork on the company property and had authorized cannon to be mounted for its defense. However Fort Ohio was never formally garrisoned by troops from the Virginia regiment. Because it was only 400 yards (370 m) away from Fort Cumberland, although separated by the river, it did not seem necessary that it should be garrisoned. The Ohio Company had employed many frontiersmen to trap the fur animals, and these riflemen were expected to defend the fort if it was to be attacked by Indians. Soldiers from Fort Cumberland spent time at Fort Ohio when not on duty, therefore it was deemed not necessary to place regular troops at the fort.
