= Redstone Old Fort =

French colonial era militia fort in Pennsylvania

- Fayette County, Pennsylvania, USA

Site information
- Type: Fort
- Controlled by: City of Brownsville, Pennsylvania

Location
- Approximate location of Redstone Old Fort in Pennsylvania
- Coordinates: 40°1′12″N 79°53′22″W

Site history
- Built: 1759
- In use: 1759-1778
- Battles/wars: French and Indian War, Lord Dunmore's War

Garrison information
- Past commanders: Captain Michael Cresap

Redstone Old Fort — written as Redstone or Red-Stone Fort or (for a short time when built) Fort Burd — on the Nemacolin Trail, was the name of the French and Indian War-era wooden fort built in 1759 by Pennsylvania militia colonel James Burd to guard the ancient Indian trail's river ford on a mound overlooking the eastern shore of the Monongahela River (colloquially, just "the Mon") in what is now Fayette County, Pennsylvania, near, or (more likely) on the banks of Dunlap's Creek at the confluence. The site is unlikely to be the same as an earlier fort the French document as Hangard dated to 1754 and which was confusedly, likely located on the nearby stream called Redstone Creek. (Note: located about a mile and a half (downriver) to the north, or slightly less than one mile north of the site of the elevated bridge of today's U.S. Route 40 and Nemacolin Castle but the naming situation which is already confused because that means the Hangard blockhouse was located along the banks of the larger Redstone Creek along the east bank of the Monongahela, down slope from where Nemacolin Castle was constructed on the bluffs above.) Red sandstones predominate the deposited rock column of the entire region.

== History ==
=== Early trail improvements ===
Geopolitically, Redstone was a frequent point of embarkation to cross the Monongahela River for travelers who had crossed the Alleghenies or were heading west via the Monongahela and Ohio Rivers by boat. Its strategic importance had long been recognized and used by the Indians, and it was a target terminus of Braddock's Road during the French and Indian War. Redstone Old Fort was the terminus of an Indian trail which settlers improved around 1750. They afterward called it Nemacolin's Trail, named after the Indian chief who assisted the improvement through the mountain pass. From this area, travelers could travel by water downstream on the Monongahela river to what is now Pittsburgh, or overland, by trails that later became Brownsville Road to the same destination.

The fortress site was chosen to guard and command the crossing point (Note: The Mon river ford and related shallows were arrayed slightly upstream (south) in the vicinity of the Old U.S. Route 40 steel arch bridge connecting to West Brownsville. Fort Burd was the last fort built by Colonel Burd, who'd spent most of the prior two years overseeing construction of forts in western Pennsylvania. Since a location on the south bank of Dunlap's Creek would have had a commanding field of fire (militarily) over the nearly adjacent river fording point. Nemacolin's Trail likely continued along the opposite bank of the Mon river south and upstream—the path of Pennsylvania Route 88 southbound away from California, Pennsylvania.) of the formidable east–west obstacle of the Monongahela River along the route of an Indian trail from the Potomac River—along one of the few mountain passes allowing traffic between the Ohio Country and the eastern seaboard cities. During 1749 and 1750, the Delaware Indian chief Nemacolin and Maryland frontiersman Thomas Cresap supervised improving the trail from the east to Redstone Creek, but Chief Nemacolin was a continuing presence in the war against the Mingo and Shawnee, and anecdotes place him at Nemacolin Castle waiting for Colonel Burd.

=== French and Indian War ===
Col. James Burd ordered construction of the fort in 1759 on an earthwork mound left behind by prehistoric Indians, known as the Mound Builders. The American colonists called these mounds "old forts", and this one had large red sandstone blocks that had been placed at the top, suggesting the site may once have been part of a fortification of some kind. It was also, after the area was settled, the site of the local settlement of the Religious Society of Friends (Quakers) and the place they called "Redstone Meeting". Around this time (1750s–1760s) a far sighted businessman-farmer, anticipating that any settlements west of the Alleghenies had to funnel down Nemacolin's Trail to the river crossing acted to acquire ownership of the lands, which ultimately gave the area its later historic and current name: Brownsville, Pennsylvania. Brown himself did not move to the lands but acted as landlord and real estate magnate, selling much of the land piecemeal, and large plots to Jacob Bowman, who became a prime mover in the tremendous industrial development of the town.

=== Lord Dunmore's War ===
Redstone Old Fort proved significant in the Colony of Virginia's war against the Mingo and Shawnee tribes, known as Lord Dunmore's War (1774–75). It was occupied by Capt. Michael Cresap, owner of a trading post, to prevent the local Shawnee from controlling it. Under authority of the colonial government of Virginia, Cresap had taken up extensive tracts of land at and below the mouth of Middle Island Creek (now Sistersville, West Virginia). He had gone there in the early spring of 1774 with a party of men to settle his holdings.

Ebenezer Zane, afterward a famed Indian fighter and guide, was engaged at the same time and in the same way with a small party of men on lands which he had taken up at or near the mouth of Sandy Creek. A group under the command of James Harrod left the fort 25 May 1774 going down river to settle lands in Kentucky, but returned to the fort due to the threat from the Shawnee. A third and larger group that included George Rogers Clark, had gathered at the mouth of the Little Kanawha River (the present site of Parkersburg, West Virginia). They were waiting there for the arrival of other Virginians who were expected to join them at that point before moving downriver to settle lands in Kentucky.

=== After the American Revolution ===
In 1789, historic Nemacolin Castle, trading post, and tavern was built up on the bluff about 0.75 miles to the east along Burd's Road (the western stretch of The Nemacolin Trail through Brownsville and across Washington County to Wheeling, West Virginia, eastwards to the junction with Braddock's Road in Uniontown by Bowman near Redstone Old Fort and this crossing, at what became a major link in the first National Road at what is today the towns of West Brownsville and Brownsville. The early settlement around the fort also came to be called Redstone, but eventually became known as Brownsville, Pennsylvania, after its farsighted developer Thomas Brown. The use of "Redstone" devolved to apply to just one of its neighborhoods.

Redstone Old Fort is mentioned in C. M. Ewing's The Causes of That So Called Whiskey Insurrection of 1794 (1930) as being the site of a July 27, 1791, meeting in "Opposition to the Whiskey Excise Tax," during the Whiskey Rebellion. It was by some considered the first meeting of that insurrection.

In 1803 Meriwether Lewis mentioned Redstone Old Fort in a letter to President Thomas Jefferson, in which he detailed his route from Harper's Ferry to Pittsburgh.

William Trent established the Hangard in January–February 1754 before moving on to join the construction crew working to build a fort on the Forks of the Ohio

== See also ==
- Fort Gaddis - a fortified log cabin in Fayette County, PA.
- Pennsylvania forts in the French and Indian War

== Bibliography ==
- Thomas Lynch Montgomery, ed. (1916). Report of the Commission to Locate the Site of the Frontier Forts of Pennsylvania. W.S. Ray, state printer.
