= Braddock Road (Braddock expedition) =

Road in Maryland and Pennsylvania built in 1755

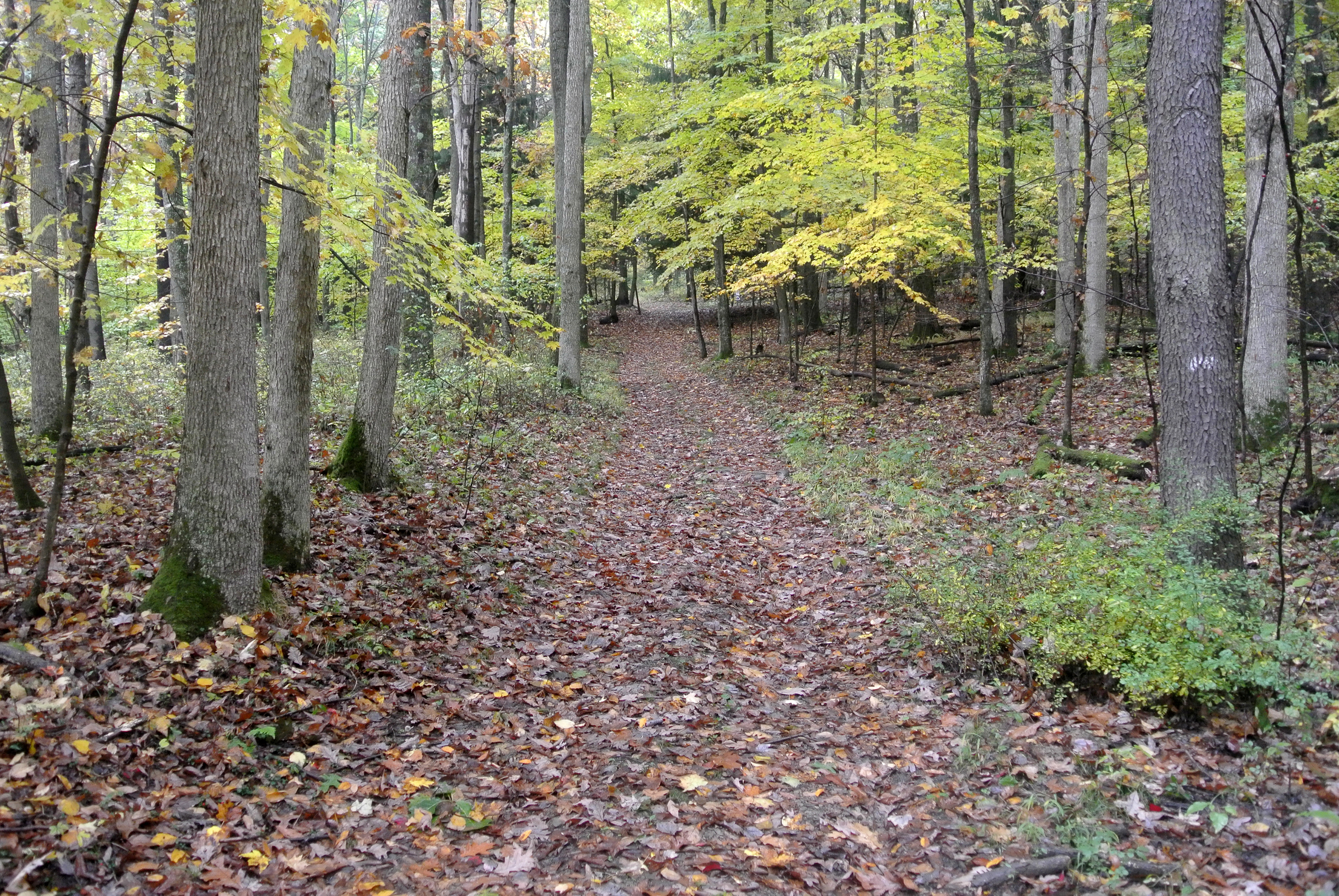

Route information
- Length: 110 mi (180 km)
- History: Constructed by troops of the Virginia militia and British regulars during the Braddock Expedition of the French and Indian War.

Major junctions
- Southeast end: Fort Cumberland in Cumberland, MD
- Northwest end: Fort Duquesne in Pittsburgh, PA

The Braddock Road was a military road built in 1755 in what was then British America and is now the United States. It was the first improved road to cross the barrier of the successive ridgelines of the Appalachian Mountains. It was constructed by troops of Virginia militia and British regulars commanded by General Edward Braddock of the Coldstream Guards, part of an expedition to conquer the Ohio Country from the French at the beginning of the French and Indian War, the North American portion of the Seven Years' War. George Washington was an aide-de-camp to General Braddock (one of his favorites) who accompanied the expedition. The expedition gave him his first field military experience along with other American military officers. A number of these men would profit from this experience during the Revolutionary War.

== Construction ==
In 1755, Braddock was sent to remove the French from Fort Duquesne (Pittsburgh). Starting from Fort Cumberland, General Braddock ordered 600 men, commanded by Major Chapman and Sir John St. Clair, to cut a military road over Haystack Mountain. The road followed an Indian path known as Nemacolin's path which George Washington and Christopher Gist had improved for the Ohio Company. Chapman’s task was to build the road to Little Meadows, about 20 miles away.

After a day of road-building, Maj. Chapman's men had only built two miles of road and had destroyed three wagons trying to get over the treacherous terrain encountered on the mountain. Braddock was about to dispatch 300 more men to the road crew when Lt. Spendlow informed him of an easier route.

Braddock took approximately 1400 men, with accompanying wagons, along Spendlow's route and joined Chapman's road at Spendlow's Camp, in today's LaVale, Maryland.

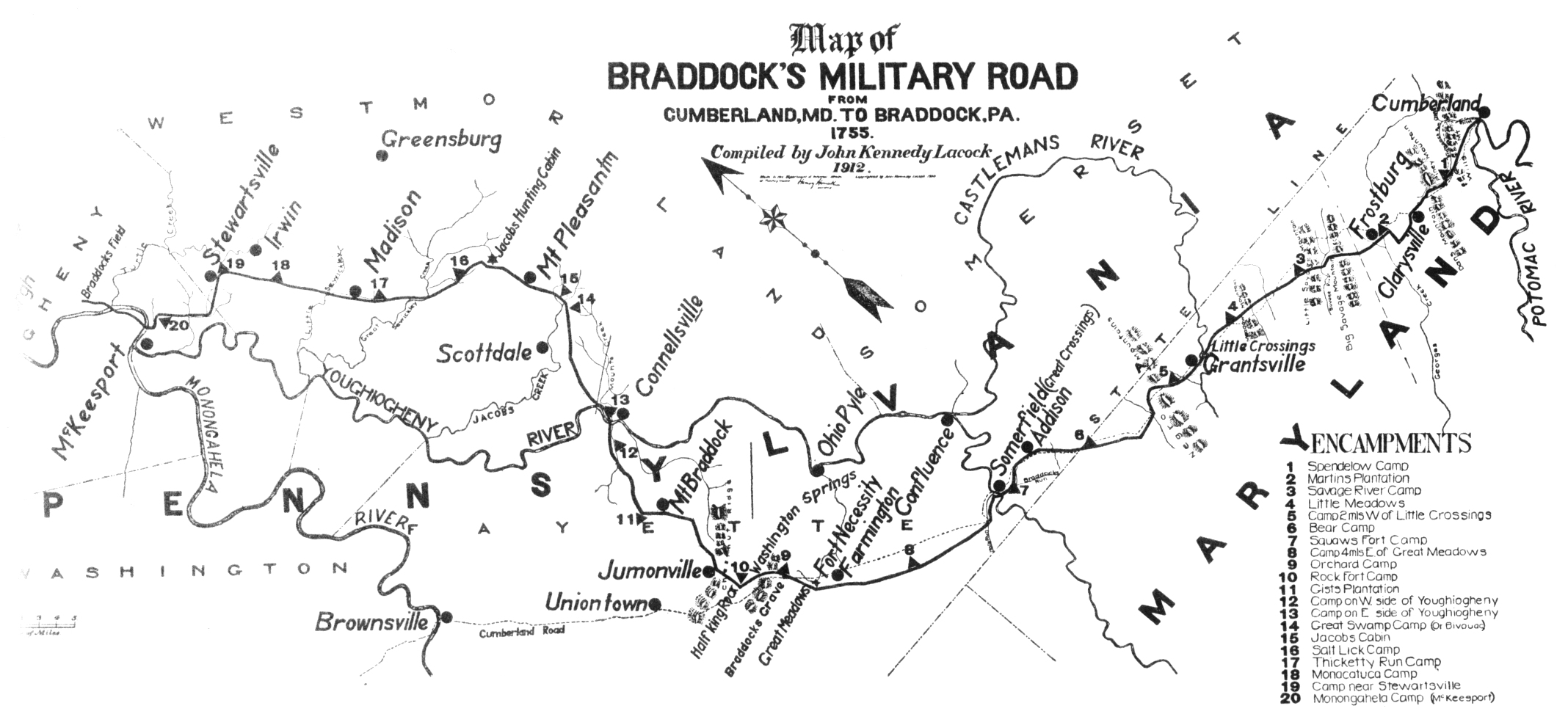
Lacock's map of the road

Braddock met defeat east of Fort Duquesne and was fatally wounded. He was buried in the middle of the road he built, and his soldiers marched over the grave, with the hope of concealing the grave's location from the Indians. The grave was found years later by road workers, and the grave was moved. The site is now marked by a marble monument erected in 1913.

The Forbes Expedition, a more successful British expedition mounted against Fort Duquesne in 1758, used a different route through the mountains west of Carlisle, Pennsylvania, along what became known as Forbes' Road.

The Cumberland Road, which subsequently became part of the National Road and later U.S. Route 40, roughly parallel Braddock's Road between Cumberland, Maryland, and Chestnut Ridge near Uniontown.

In August 1908 and again during June and July 1909, John Kennedy Lacock, a Harvard professor originally from Amity, in Washington County, Pennsylvania, was able to identify the path of Braddock's march. He hired Ernest K. Weller to photograph the road. Lacock's commissioned photographs survive in the form of postcards, which he published in 1910, and his written account was published in the Pennsylvania Magazine of History and Biography in 1914. The road Lacock discovered was a road made by over 30 years of colonial settlers following Braddock's trail.

== See also ==
- Great Britain in the Seven Years War
- Forbes Road
