= Fort Cocke =

Coordinates: 39.3792°N 78.8669°W

Fort Cocke was a stockade, made of wooden palisades up stream from Fort Ashby. It was a square ninety feet on a side and enclosed about 1/5 acre. Blockhouses were built at each of the four corners. A barracks to house fifty men was constructed within the stockade. It was built by Captain William Cocke's First Company of Rangers under orders of George Washington dated October 26, 1755. It has been suggested that the fort was probably completed within a month.

It was constructed south of George Parker's land. This was on Lot 13 of the Lord Fairfax's Patterson Creek Manor. The fort was constructed on the east side of Pattersons Creek, on a flat terrace above a rocky shelf overlooking the creek bottom, about 1.5 miles (2.4 km) south of present Headsville, West Virginia.

Being it was small, Fort Cocke was a place of limited refuge for settlers living in the Pattersons Creek Valley. After the capture of Fort Duquesne, troops garrisoning the fort were gradually withdrawn and the fort was abandoned during the 1760s. In a 1770 trip down Pattersons Creek George Washington pointed out the place where the fort had stood indicating it has fallen to nothing within 15 years.

== See also ==
- Fort Ashby
- Fort Ohio
- Fort Sellers

== Bibliography ==
- Hannings, Bud (2006). Forts of the United States: An Historical Dictionary, 16th through 19th Centuries. Jefferson, North Carolina: McFarland. ISBN 978-0-7864-1796-4.
