= Chestnut Ridge, Pennsylvania =

Unincorporated community in Pennsylvania, US

- Unincorporated community
- Location within Pennsylvania
- Coordinates: 39°58′49″N 79°48′23″W
- Country: United States
- State: Pennsylvania
- County: Fayette
- Elevation: 1,020 ft (310 m)
- Time zone: UTC-5 (Eastern (EST))
  - Summer (DST): UTC-4 (EDT)
- ZIP code: 15422
- Area codes: 724, 878
- GNIS feature ID: 1171737

Chestnut Ridge is an unincorporated community in Fayette County, Pennsylvania, United States. The community is 7.3 miles (11.7 km) northwest of Uniontown. Chestnut Ridge has a post office, with ZIP code 15422, which opened on August 22, 1912.
