= Fort Ashby =

Historic fort in West Virginia, U.S.

- U.S. National Register of Historic Places
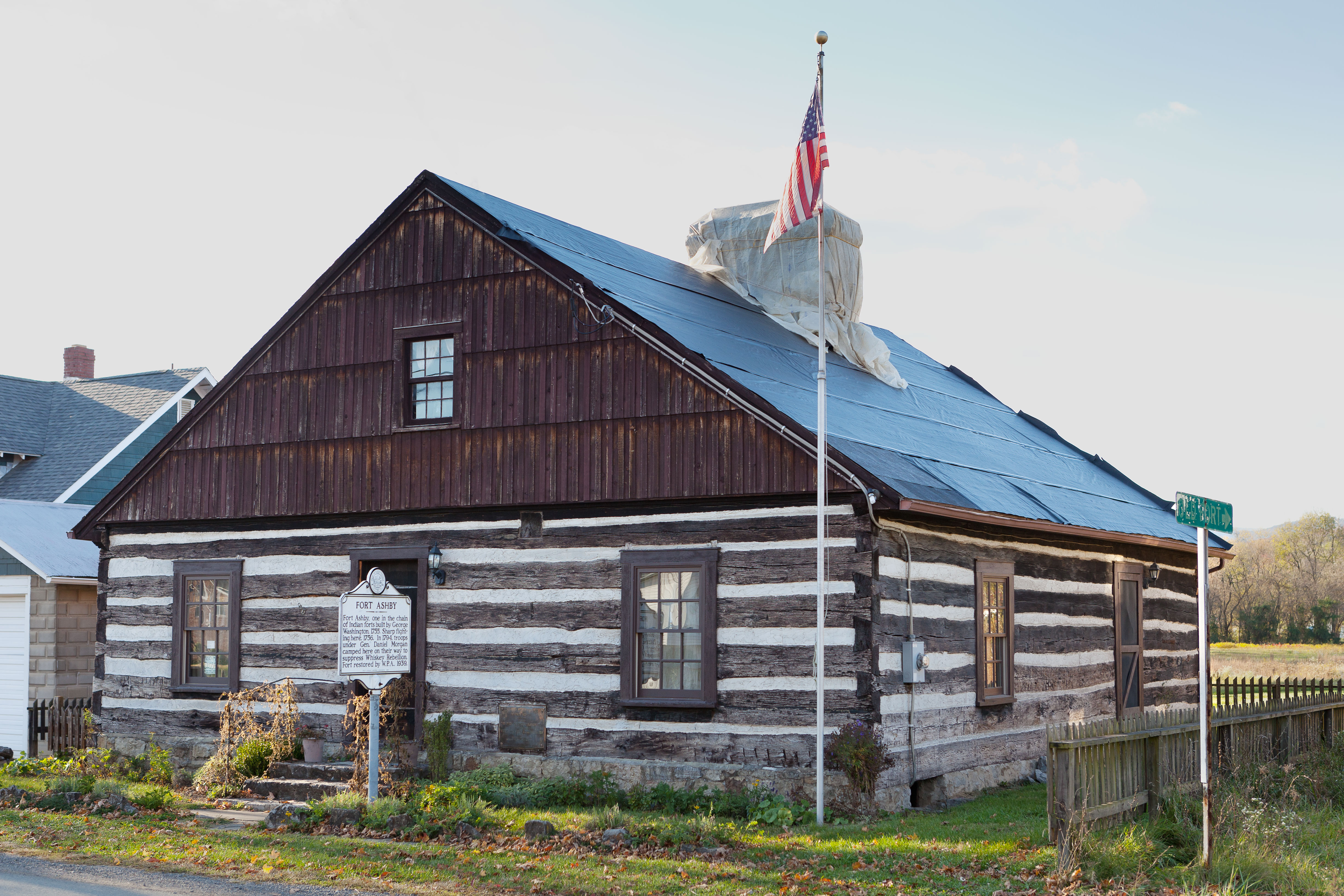

- Location within Eastern Panhandle of West Virginia Location within West Virginia Location within the United States
- Location: Fort Ashby, West Virginia
- Built: 1755
- NRHP reference No.: 70000657
- Added to NRHP: 18 December 1970

Fort Ashby is a historic stockade fort located in Fort Ashby, West Virginia, US. A military installation constructed during the French and Indian War, it is listed on the National Register of Historic Places.

== Origin ==
On 26 October 1755, Colonel George Washington gave orders to build a stockade and fort on the east side of Pattersons Creek. The fort was completed about six weeks later, commanded by Captain John Ashby and his 2nd Company of Rangers. He had orders from Washington to remain quiet as long as he could and to hold the fort as long as possible, but if necessary, rather than surrender, he should burn it and try to escape to Fort Sellers on the east side of the mouth of Patterson's Creek. The only major battle at Fort Ashby occurred in 1756, when Lieutenant Robert Rutherford and his Rangers were defeated by a band of French and Indians.

== Ownership ==
The Friends of Ashby's Fort own Fort Ashby. The museum is open Fridays, Saturdays, and Sundays, March - November, and for special events. It was listed on the National Register of Historic Places in 1970.

== See also ==
- Fort Cocke
- Fort Ohio – 1749 stockade fort in what is now West Virginia, US
- Fort Sellers
