= Fort Sellers =

- Location within West Virginia
- 39.5637°N 78.7245°W
- Type: Fort
- Location: Mineral County, West Virginia, U.S.

History
- Built: 1756 (270 years ago)
- Built by: George Washington

Fort Sellers was a small stockade on the east side of Pattersons Creek at the confluence with the Potomac River, in Franklin District, in present-day Mineral County, West Virginia. The fort was erected by Colonel Washington.

Fort Sellers was one of a chain of four forts protecting the frontier. Fort Ohio was the first in the chain with Fort Sellers being the second and Fort Ashby and Fort Cocke being the outermost forts.

The dimensions of this fort are not known, but it was most likely similar in size to Fort Ashby, the stockade being 90 square feet (8.4 m^{2}). The fort did not figure into Washington's plans for the defense of the frontier for on May 18, 1756, he wrote Col. Stephen stating he wished it were possible to remove the stores at the mouth of Pattersons Creek to Ashby's fort. Stephen was further told that if he found it impractical to move the supplies stored there from the fort, then he was to make the fort as strong as possible and to strengthen the garrison. He was also instructed to "put a more experienced officer than Mr. Brockenbrough (Lieut. Austin Brockenbrough, 10th Company, Virginia Regiment) at it, whose youth perhaps may be a means of his doing something inconsistent."
