= Redstone Creek (Pennsylvania) =

Stream in Pennsylvania, USA

Redstone Creek Tributary to Monongahela River
- Location of Redstone Creek mouth Redstone Creek (Pennsylvania) (the United States)

Location
- Country: United States
- State: Pennsylvania
- County: Fayette
- City: Uniontown

Physical characteristics
- Source: Georges Creek divide on west side of Chestnut Ridge
  - location: about 3 miles east of Fairchance, Pennsylvania
  - coordinates: 39°49′03″N 079°41′25″W
  - elevation: 2,370 ft (720 m)
- Mouth: Monongahela River
  - location: about 0.25 miles north of Brownsville, Pennsylvania
  - coordinates: 40°02′09″N 079°52′32″W
  - elevation: 744 ft (227 m)
- Length: 27.73 mi (44.63 km)
- Basin size: 108.60 square miles (281.3 km^{2})
- Discharge
  - location: Monongahela River
  - average: 152.95 cu ft/s (4.331 m^{3}/s) at mouth with Monongahela River

Basin features
- Progression: northwest
- River system: Monongahela River
- Tributaries
  - left: Coal Lick Run; Jennings Run; Colvin Run
  - right: Lick Run; Cove Run; Rankin Run (and Bute Rune); Bolden Run; Allen Run; Shear Hollow; Crabapple Run; Washwater Run
- Waterbodies: Hutchinson Reservoir No.3; Hutchinson Reservoir No.2; Hutchinson Reservoir No.1

Redstone Creek is a historically important widemouthed canoe and river boat-navigable brook-sized tributary stream of the Monongahela River in Fayette County, Pennsylvania. The creek is 28.4 miles (45.7 km) long, running from headwaters on Chestnut Ridge north through the city of Uniontown and reaching the Monongahela at Brownsville. Located in a 1/4-mile-wide valley with low streambanks, the site was ideal for ship building in a region geologically most often characterized by steep-plunging relatively inaccessible banks — wide enough to launch and float several large boats, and indeed steamboats after 1811, and slow-moving enough to provide good docks and parking places while craft were outfitting.

Brownsville, at the mouth of Redstone Creek, was an important center for boat-building, including the manufacture of paddlewheel steamboats that traveled as far as New Orleans, and, later, the upper navigable part of the Missouri. Flatboat construction is documented at the site from 1782, and the Braddock Expedition established a supply base (blockhouse) on the stream's south bank which the French destroyed after first taking Fort Necessity in 1754. The creek hosting this important activity played a critical role in the transshipment of goods and settlers in the Mississippi Basin, as it enabled the other industries in and around Brownsville to outfit and equip the settlers headed west.

Nestled in the foothills on the west side of the mountains, Brownsville was a gateway funneling settlers to the Ohio Country, the lands of the Louisiana Territory, and did so until well after 1853, when railroads reached the Missouri River at Kanesville, Iowa (one Emigrant Trails destination of the town's flatboats), the far west and the Oregon Country —for the town astride the shortest, if not the easiest, land route across the great barrier to east-west traffic presented by the Allegheny Mountains.

== Variant names ==
According to the Geographic Names Information System, it has also been known historically as:

- Red Stone Creek
- The Sulphur Creek

== History ==
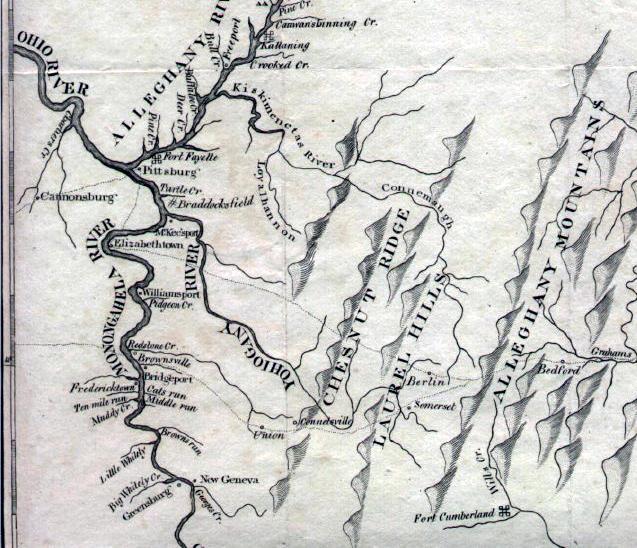
Redstone Creek and Brownsville, circa 1803

The first Europeans arrived in the 1710s as traders. Michael Bezallion was the first to describe the forks of the Ohio in a manuscript in 1717, and later that year European traders established posts and settlements in the area. Europeans first began to settle in the region in 1748, when the first Ohio Company, an English land speculation company, won a grant of 200,000 acres (810 km^{2}) in the upper Ohio Valley. From a post at present-day Cumberland, Maryland, the company began to construct an 80-mile (130 km) wagon road to the Monongahela River employing a Delaware Indian chief named Nemacolin and a party of settlers headed by Capt. Michael Cresap to begin widening the track into a road following mostly the same route as an ancient Indian trail which is now known as Nemacolin's Trail. The river crossing and flats at Redstone Creek, the earliest point and shortest distance the choices a wagon road descent could follow (later in the war, fortified as Fort Burd, now Brownsville) was one of several possible destinations.

In the 1740s the government purchased (ca. 1744) trans-Allegheny lands from Native American tribes, giving England a competing claim on the lands of the Ohio Basin. Around 1748 the Ohio Company was formed and began explorations and planning of ways and means of exploiting the rights they'd purchased. In 1750, the company hired Chief Nemacolin, a Delaware Indian, and a Virginia farmer and owner of a land grant in West Virginia.

== See also ==
- History of Pittsburgh
- Redstone Old Fort
- Fort Necessity

== Additional images ==
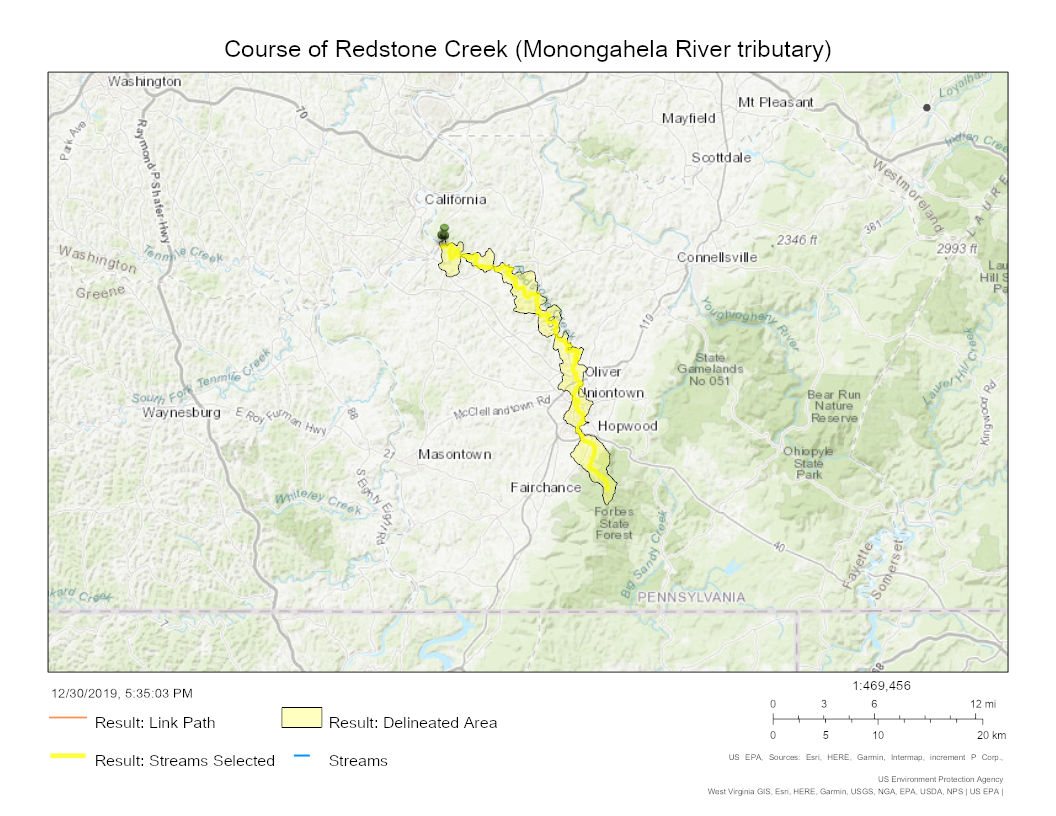
Course of Redstone Creek (Monongahela River tributary) in Fayette County, Pennsylvania

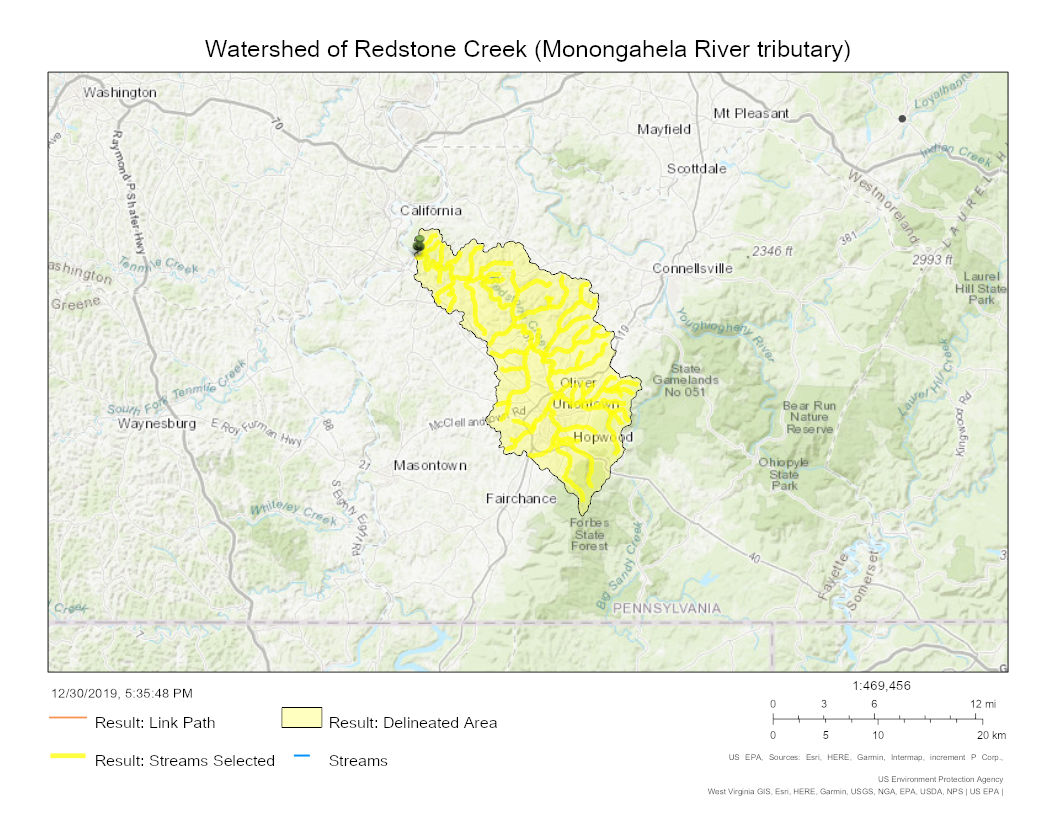
Watershed of Redstone Creek (Monongahela River tributary) in Fayette County, Pennsylvania
