= Nemacolin's Path =

Ancient Native American trail

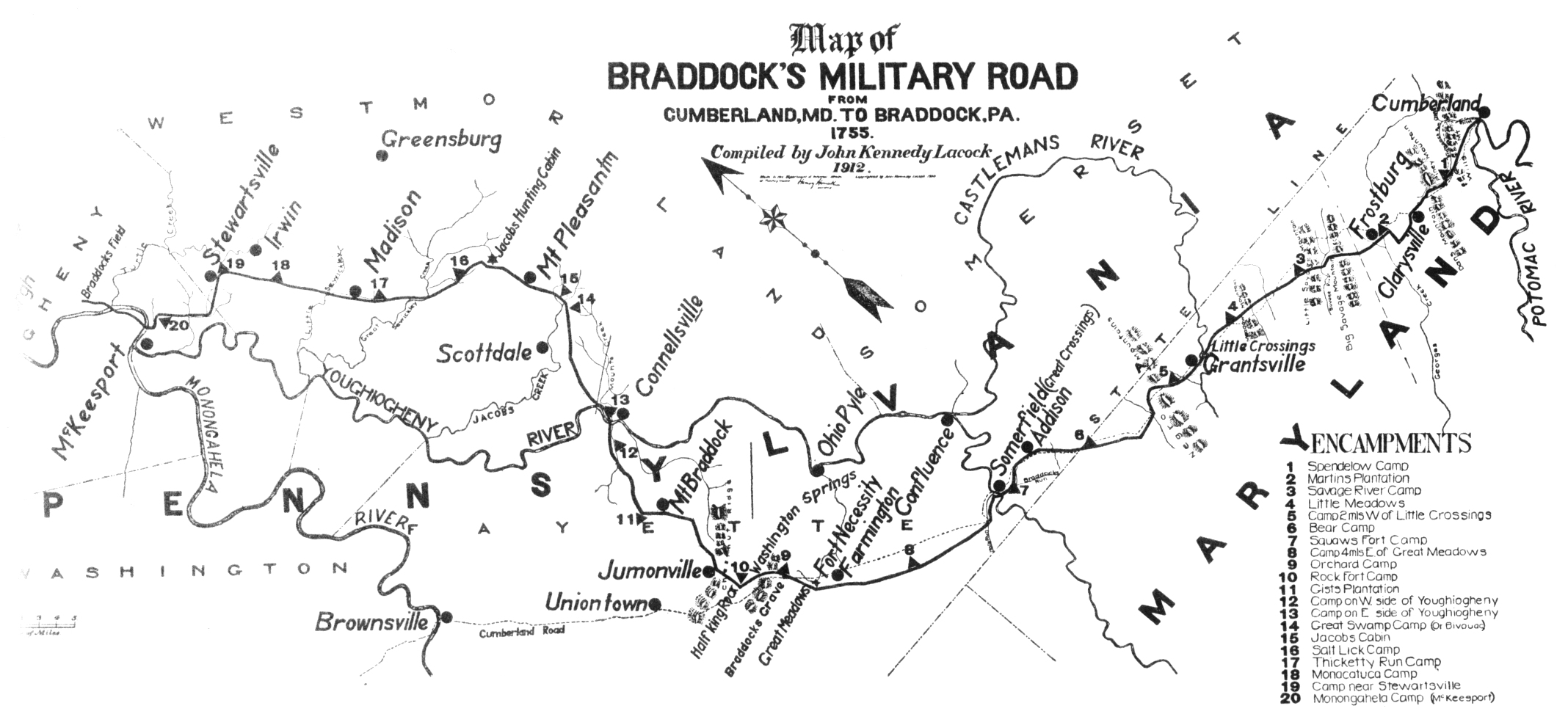

Route information
- Length: 73 mi (117 km)
- History: An ancient Native American network of trails used by the Delaware and Shawnee. It was mapped and cleared for the Ohio Company to provide a gateway to the Ohio Country, later serving as the foundation for Braddock's Road and the National Road.

Major junctions
- Southeast end: Wills Creek pass near Cumberland, MD
- Northwest end: Mouth of Redstone Creek near Brownsville, PA

Nemacolin's Trail, or less often Nemacolin's Path, was an ancient Native American trail that crossed the great barrier of the Allegheny Mountains via the Cumberland Narrows Mountain pass, connecting the watersheds of the Potomac River and the Monongahela River in the present-day United States of America. Nemacolin's Trail connected what are now Cumberland, Maryland and Brownsville, Pennsylvania.

The path was a network of trails that had long been used by Indigenous peoples in pre-colonial America. Nemacolin's Path starts near present-day Cumberland, Maryland, continuing on to Brownsville, Pennsylvania to the neighborhood known today as Redstone located at mouth of Redstone Creek. In colonial America, the site was known as Redstone Old Fort for its defensive installation.

During 1749 and 1750, the Delaware Indian chief Nemacolin and Maryland frontiersman Thomas Cresap supervised improving the trail for the Ohio Company, at the behest of Christopher Gist. They developed the template trail and in large part the route for what became known on the eastern slopes as the eastern part of Braddock's Road. In 1755 during the French and Indian War (the North American front of the Seven Years' War between the English and French), English General Edward Braddock used the eastern part of Nemacolin's Path as a military route in his attempt to capture Fort Duquesne, held by the French. (It was later developed as Pittsburgh.)

Crossing the Allegheny divide was a major task well into the 19th century, requiring much planning, time and effort. East-west highways were not built across the border between Virginia and West Virginia until late in the century. The two regions were separated by some of the harshest terrain in the mountain chain. Except for using the Cumberland Narrows, travelers would have to go hundreds of miles to the north or south to get through the mountains, as the ridgelines are oriented north-south and are nearly impassable.

Nemacolin's Trail was later paved over as the Cumberland Road, the National Road, the National Pike, and eventually U.S. Route 40, or the National Highway. U.S. Route 40 became one of the first officially recognized highways in the United States. The earlier road, known as the Cumberland Road/National Road, ran on the first cast iron bridge constructed in the United States, at Dunlap's Creek. Nemacolin's Trail became the gateway by which settlers in Conestoga wagons or stage coaches reached the lands west of the Appalachian mountains.

== See also ==
- Braddock Road (Braddock expedition)
- Allegheny Mountains
