= National Register of Historic Places listings in Montgomery County, Kentucky =

Location of Montgomery County in Kentucky

This is a list of the National Register of Historic Places listings in Montgomery County, Kentucky.

This is intended to be a complete list of the properties and districts on the National Register of Historic Places in Montgomery County, Kentucky, United States. The locations of National Register properties and districts for which the latitude and longitude coordinates are included below, may be seen in a map.

There are 18 properties and districts listed on the National Register in the county.

This National Park Service list is complete through NPS recent listings posted December 12, 2025.

== Current listings ==
	Name on the Register	Image	Date listed	Location	City or town	Description
1	Bondurant House		June 23, 1983 (#83002835)	Off U.S. Route 60; 38°05′03″N 83°53′50″W	Mount Sterling	
2	Chesapeake and Ohio Railroad Passenger and Baggage Depots	Chesapeake and Ohio Railroad Passenger and Baggage Depots	April 23, 1991 (#91000431)	North of C&O railroad tracks between S. Maysville and S. Bank Sts. 38°03′16″N 83°56′30″W	Mount Sterling	Only the passenger depot is extant.
3	William Chiles House	William Chiles House	April 23, 1991 (#91000430)	Off Richmond Rd. south of U.S. Route 60; 38°03′10″N 83°56′59″W	Mount Sterling	
4	Church of the Ascension	Church of the Ascension	July 10, 1979 (#79001025)	High and Broadway Sts. 38°03′25″N 83°56′37″W	Mount Sterling	
5	Confederate Monument of Mt. Sterling	Confederate Monument of Mt. Sterling	July 17, 1997 (#97000675)	Machpelan Cemetery, 1.5 miles east of the junction of U.S. Route 460 and Kentucky Route 713; 38°03′23″N 83°55′55″W	Mount Sterling	
6	East Mount Sterling Historic District	East Mount Sterling Historic District	April 23, 1991 (#91000433)	Roughly Harrison Ave. and N. Queen St. between E. High St. and an alley north of Strother St. 38°03′36″N 83°56′26″W	Mount Sterling	
7	W.T. Fitzpatrick House	W.T. Fitzpatrick House	April 23, 1991 (#91000429)	Apperson Heights east of S. Bank St. 38°03′11″N 83°56′28″W	Mount Sterling	
8	Gaitskill Mound Archeological Site	Gaitskill Mound Archeological Site	October 21, 1975 (#75000807)	Off Indian Mound Dr. 38°04′21″N 83°57′02″W	Mount Sterling	
9	Miss Emma Hicks Bungalow	Miss Emma Hicks Bungalow	April 23, 1991 (#91000428)	10 White Ave. 38°03′20″N 83°57′03″W	Mount Sterling	
10	KEAS Tabernacle Christian Methodist Episcopal Church	KEAS Tabernacle Christian Methodist Episcopal Church	May 26, 1983 (#83002836)	101 S. Queen St. 38°03′21″N 83°56′18″W	Mount Sterling	
11	Machpelah Cemetery	Machpelah Cemetery	April 23, 1991 (#91000427)	E. Main St. at eastern city limits 38°03′30″N 83°55′55″W	Mount Sterling	
12	Methodist Episcopal Church South	Methodist Episcopal Church South	April 23, 1991 (#91000426)	Junction of E. Main and N. Wilson Sts. 38°03′25″N 83°56′26″W	Mount Sterling	
13	Monarch Milling Company	Monarch Milling Company	April 23, 1991 (#91000425)	Junction of S. Maysville and E. Locust; 38°03′18″N 83°56′29″W	Mount Sterling	
14	Ralph Morgan Stone House		April 10, 1980 (#80001658)	East of Mount Sterling on Harper's Ridge Rd. 38°02′08″N 83°49′44″W	Mount Sterling	
15	Mount Sterling Commercial District	Mount Sterling Commercial District	October 3, 1980 (#80001659)	U.S. Route 60 and Kentucky Route 11; 38°03′22″N 83°56′28″W	Mount Sterling	
16	Northwest Residential District	Northwest Residential District	September 14, 1989 (#89001422)	Roughly Kentucky Route 1991, N. Maysville St., W. Main St., Samuels Ave., High St., Antwerp Ave., Holt, Sycamore, and Sterling; 38°03′34″N 83°56′47″W	Mount Sterling	
17	Enoch Smith House	Enoch Smith House	August 19, 1980 (#80001660)	Kentucky Route 1; 38°03′10″N 83°57′41″W	Mount Sterling	
18	Wright-Greene Mound Complex		February 12, 1998 (#98000093)	Address Restricted	Mount Sterling	

== See also ==
- List of National Historic Landmarks in Kentucky
- National Register of Historic Places listings in Kentucky
