= Beechland =

Beechland may refer to:

- Beechland (Jeffersontown, Kentucky), listed on the National Register of Historic Places (NRHP) in Jefferson County
- Beechland (Taylorsville, Kentucky), NRHP-listed in Spencer County
- Beechland (Natchez, Mississippi), NRHP-listed in Adams County
