= Stephen G. Burbridge =

Union Army officer in the American Civil War

Stephen Gano Burbridge
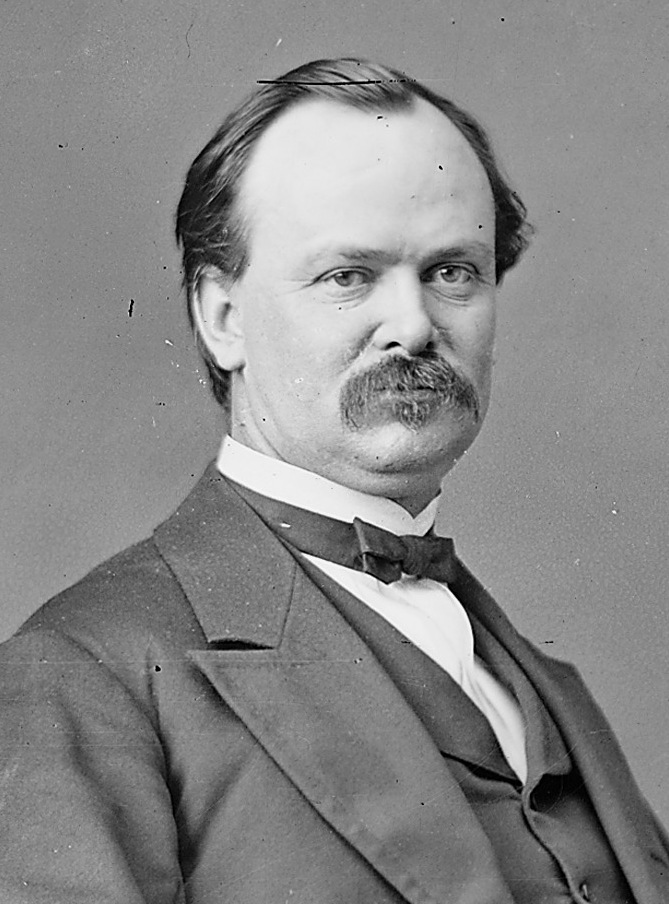
- Major General Stephen G. Burbridge
- Born: August 19, 1831; Georgetown, Kentucky, US
- Died: December 2, 1894 (aged 63); Brooklyn, New York, US
- Burial place: Arlington National Cemetery
- Military career
- Allegiance: United States; Union
- Branch: United States Army; Union Army
- Service years: 1861–1865
- Rank: Brigadier General; Brevet Major General
- Nicknames: "Butcher" Burbridge, "Butcher of Kentucky"
- Commands: 26th Kentucky Infantry Regiment; 1st Brigade, 1st Division, XIII Corps; District of Kentucky
- Conflicts: American Civil War; Battle of Shiloh; Battle of Fort Hindman; Battle of Champion Hill; Bayou Teche Campaign; Battle of Bayou Bourbeux; Battle of Mt. Sterling; Battle of Cynthiana; First Battle of Saltville

Stephen Gano Burbridge (August 19, 1831 – December 2, 1894), also known as "Butcher" Burbridge or the "Butcher of Kentucky", was a controversial Union general during the American Civil War. In June 1864 he was given command over the Commonwealth of Kentucky, where guerrillas had carried out attacks against Unionists. He imposed martial law and was criticized for punitive actions against persons accused of being guerrillas.

== Early life ==
Burbridge was born on August 19, 1831, in Georgetown, Kentucky. He attended Georgetown College and the Kentucky Military Institute in Frankfort. Afterward he apprenticed with an established law firm and subsequently became a lawyer. He also had a large plantation.

== Civil War ==
Upon the outbreak of the American Civil War, Burbridge organized the 26th Kentucky Infantry Regiment and joined the Union Army as the regiment's colonel.

After serving as brigade commander in several campaigns, and winning the Battle of Cynthiana against John Hunt Morgan, in June 1864 Burbridge was given command of the District of Kentucky to deal with the growing problem of Confederate guerrilla campaigns. He imposed martial law, authorized by President Abraham Lincoln. His command was likened by some residents to an extended period of military siege that would last through early 1865.

On July 16, 1864, Burbridge issued Order No. 59 which declared: "Whenever an unarmed Union citizen is murdered, four guerrillas will be selected from the prison and publicly shot to death at the most convenient place near the scene of the outrages." During Burbridge's rule in Kentucky, he directed the imprisonment and execution of numerous people, including public figures, on charges of treason and other high crimes. His opponents said that many of these were baseless.

While continuing in charge of Kentucky, in October 1864, Burbridge led Union assaults against the salt works near the town of Saltville, Virginia, as part of the first Battle of Saltville. Their attack did not succeed. Among his forces were black cavalry, later organized that fall as the 5th United States Colored Cavalry Regiment. A number of wounded cavalry were murdered on the battlefield by Confederate soldiers and guerrillas from Tennessee; others were killed while being treated at a field hospital set up at Emory and Henry College. These related incidents were known as the Saltville Massacre, a war crime for which Champ Ferguson was prosecuted in October 1865 and sentenced to death by hanging.

During the 1864 presidential campaign, Burbridge tried to ensure re-election of Lincoln, by suppressing support in Kentucky for Democratic candidate George B. McClellan. His actions included arresting prominent persons favoring the candidate, including Lieutenant Governor Richard T. Jacob, and Chief Judge of the Kentucky Court of Appeals Joshua Bullitt, both of whom he deported.

After a falling out with Governor Thomas E. Bramlette, which included an attempt to take control of his troops and arms in February 1865, Burbridge was dismissed from his role of commander in Kentucky. Bramlette had quickly complained by telegram to Secretary of War Edwin M. Stanton, writing:

This unwarranted assumption of power by an imbecile commander is doubtless instigated by those who have long sought to provoke an issue with the State, and which I have prevented.

Lincoln revoked Burbridge's order. He replaced him with Major General John Palmer. Burbridge soon resigned from the army.

== Later years ==
After the war, Burbridge moved to Brooklyn, New York. He died there on December 2, 1894. He is buried in Arlington National Cemetery.

== Gallery ==
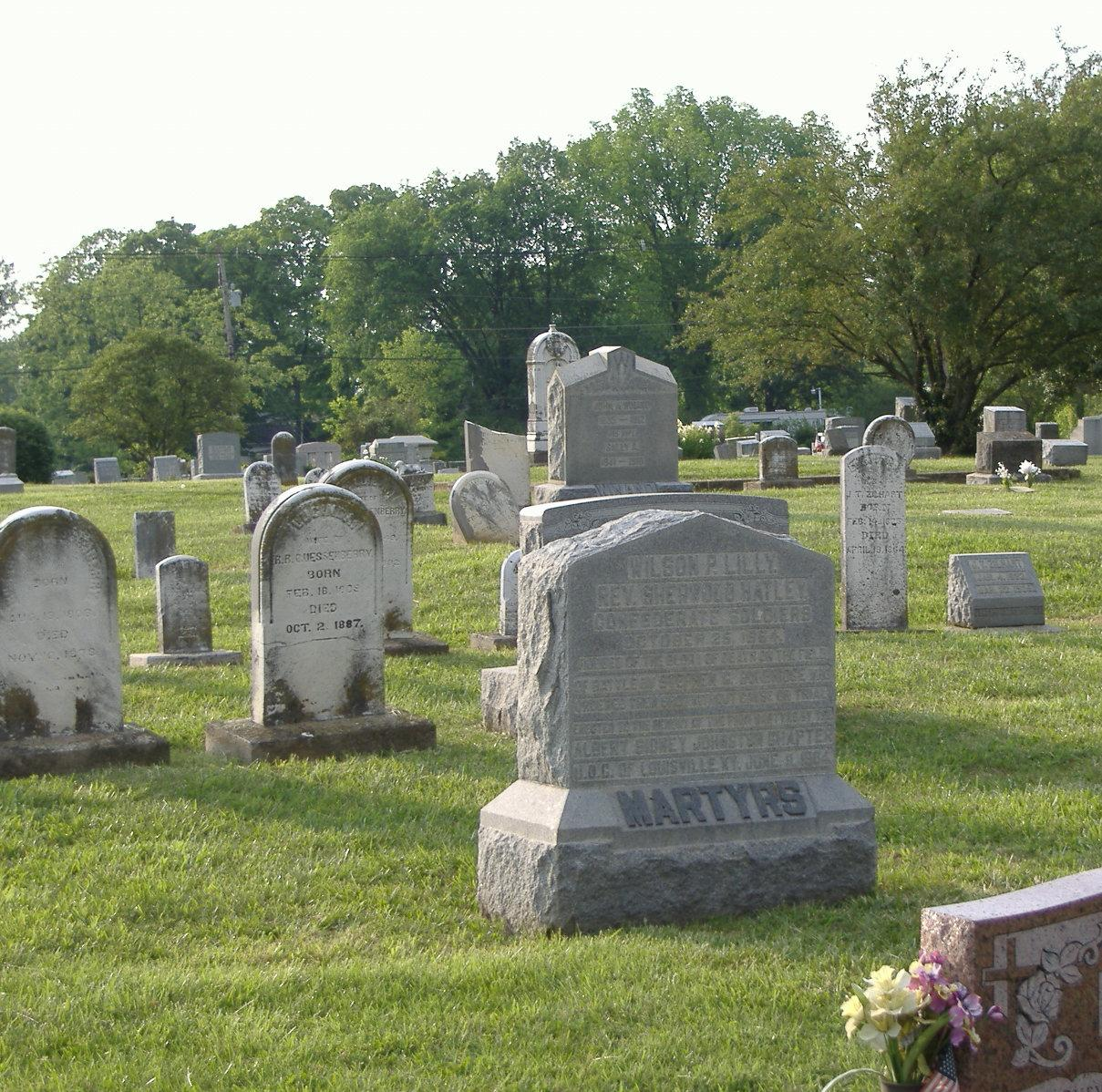
Image of the Confederate Martyrs Monument in Jeffersontown, Kentucky, for the four Confederate soldiers executed by Burbridge

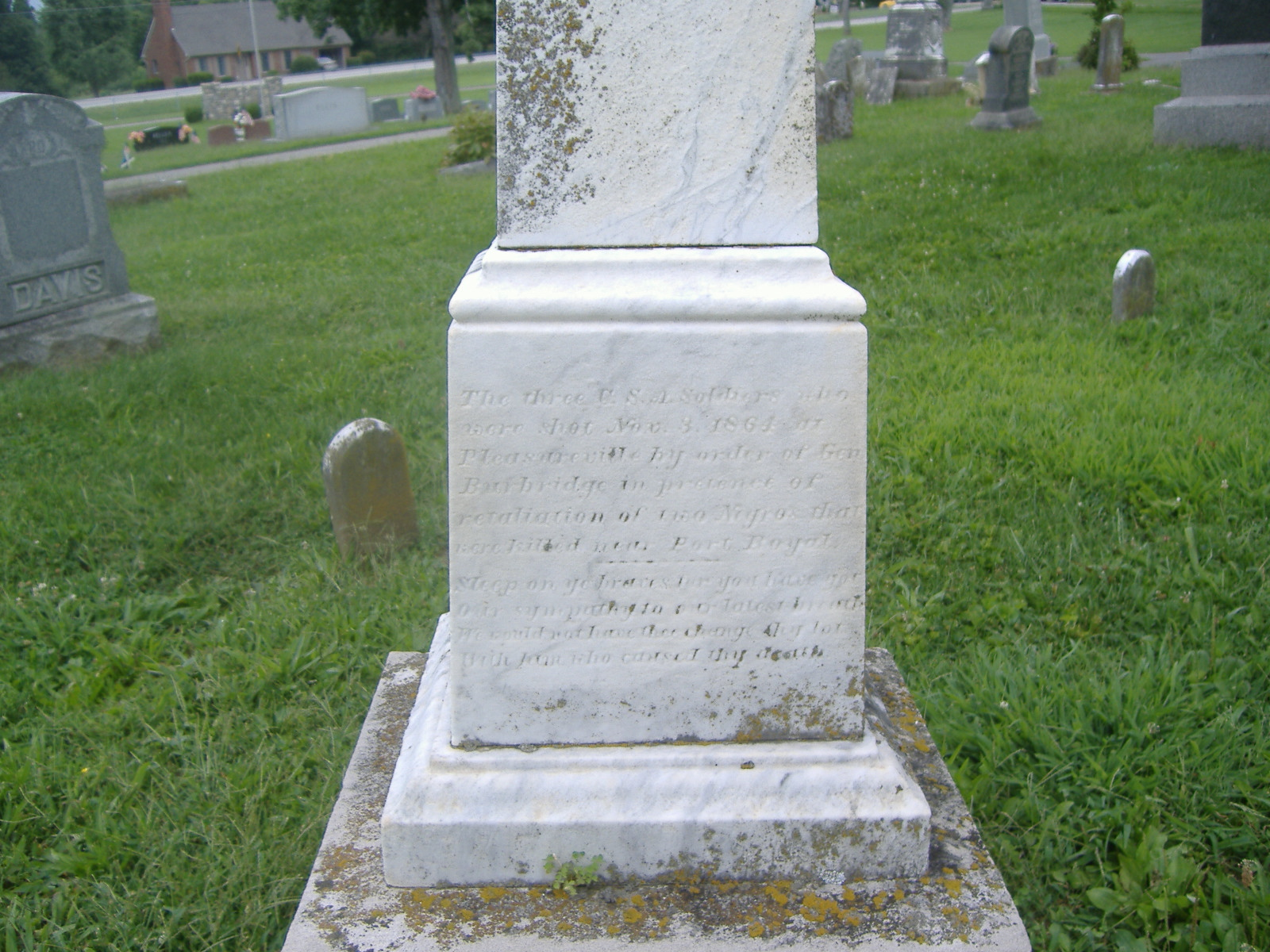
Confederate Soldiers Martyrs Monument in Eminence of Eminence, Kentucky, for the three Confederate soldiers executed by order of General Burbridge

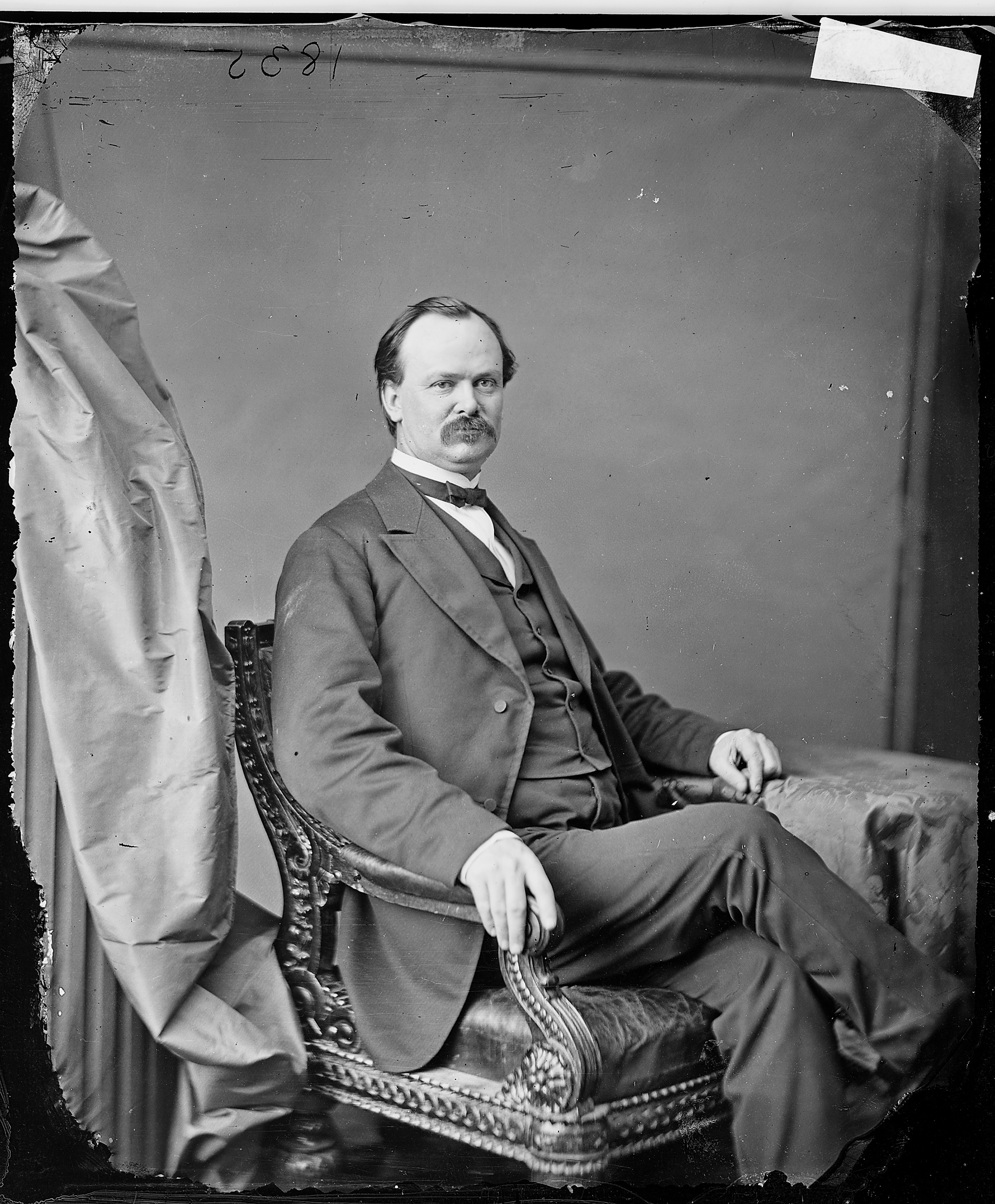
General Stephen G. Burbridge photo taken between 1860 and 1865

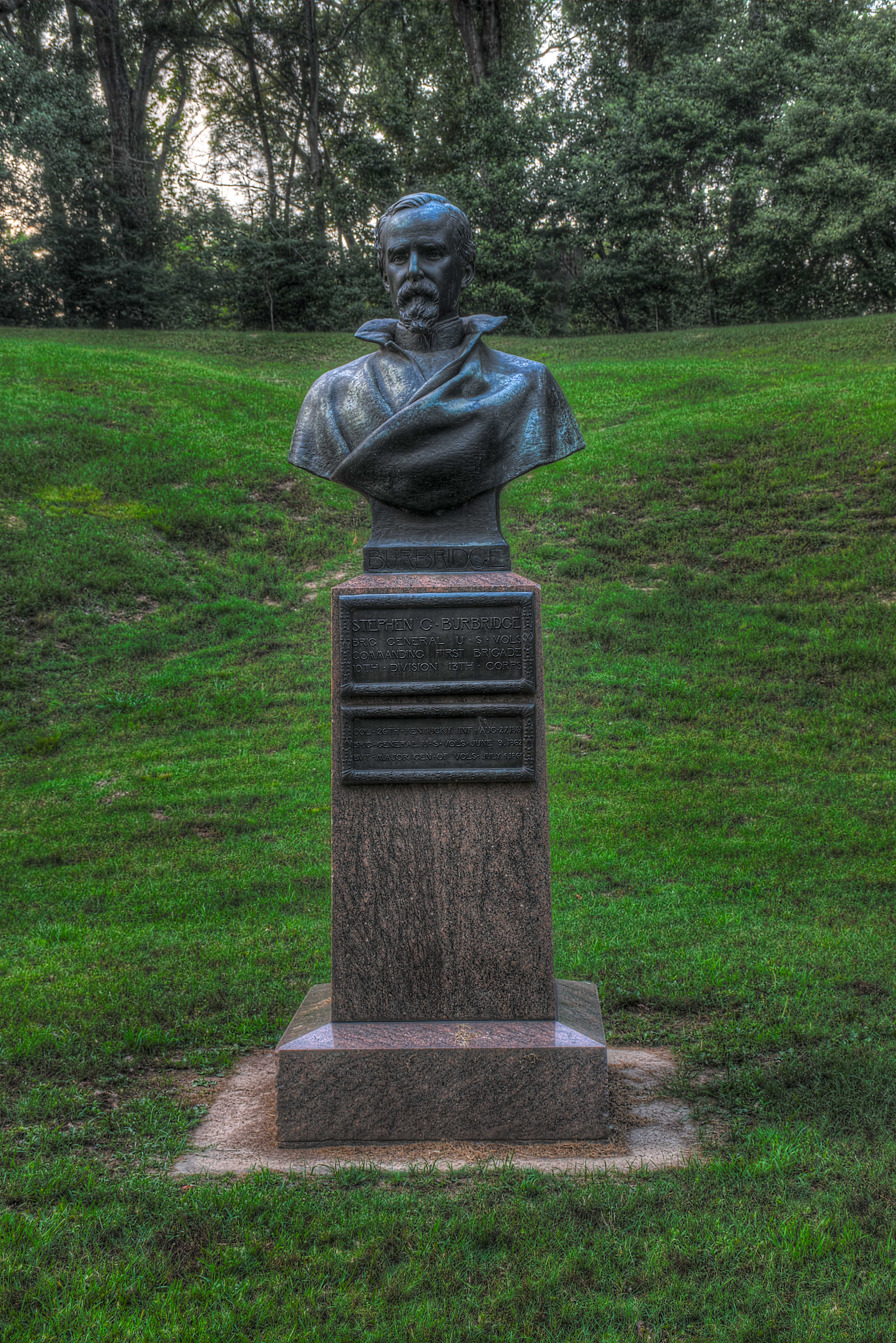
Bust of Burbridge at Vicksburg National Military Park

== See also ==
- List of American Civil War generals (Union)
- 5th United States Colored Cavalry
- American Civil War fortifications in Louisville
- Confederate Martyrs Monument in Jeffersontown
- Great Hog Swindle
- Kentucky in the American Civil War
- Louisville in the American Civil War
