= The Great Swindle =

The Great Swindle can refer to:

- The Great Swindle (1941 film), American mystery
- The Great Swindle (1971 film), Italian thriller
- The Great Swindle (novel), translation of 2013 French novel Au revoir là-haut

Related names include:

- The Great Rock 'n' Roll Swindle
- The Great Rock 'n' Roll Swindle (album)
- The Great Rock 'n' Roll Swindle (song)
- The Great Global Warming Swindle
- The Great Salad Oil Swindle
- Great Reality TV Swindle
- The Great Gold Swindle
- The Great Mint Swindle
- The Last Great Country Swindle
- The Great Rocksteady Swindle
- Great Hog Swindle
