= Jacob Yoder =

Jacob Yoder (August 11, 1758 – April 7, 1832) was a pioneer of Swiss descent. He was born in Reading, Pennsylvania and died in Spencer County, Kentucky.

After serving through the American Revolutionary War in the Pennsylvania line, he built a large boat at Fort Red Stone (now Brownsville), on the Monongahela River, which he freighted with flour and carried to New Orleans in May, 1782. With the profits of this venture he bought peltries which he sold in Havana, investing the proceeds in sugar for the Philadelphia market. This was the first attempt to navigate the Ohio and Mississippi rivers for commercial purposes. Subsequently, he settled in Spencer County, Kentucky, and took part in equipping and keeping in the field the military forces in the northwest territory.

He is known for his invention of the flatboat.

Beechland, the home in Spencer County, Kentucky, which he built in 1804, survives and is listed on the National Register of Historic Places.
