= Confederate Monument of Mt. Sterling =

- U.S. National Register of Historic Places
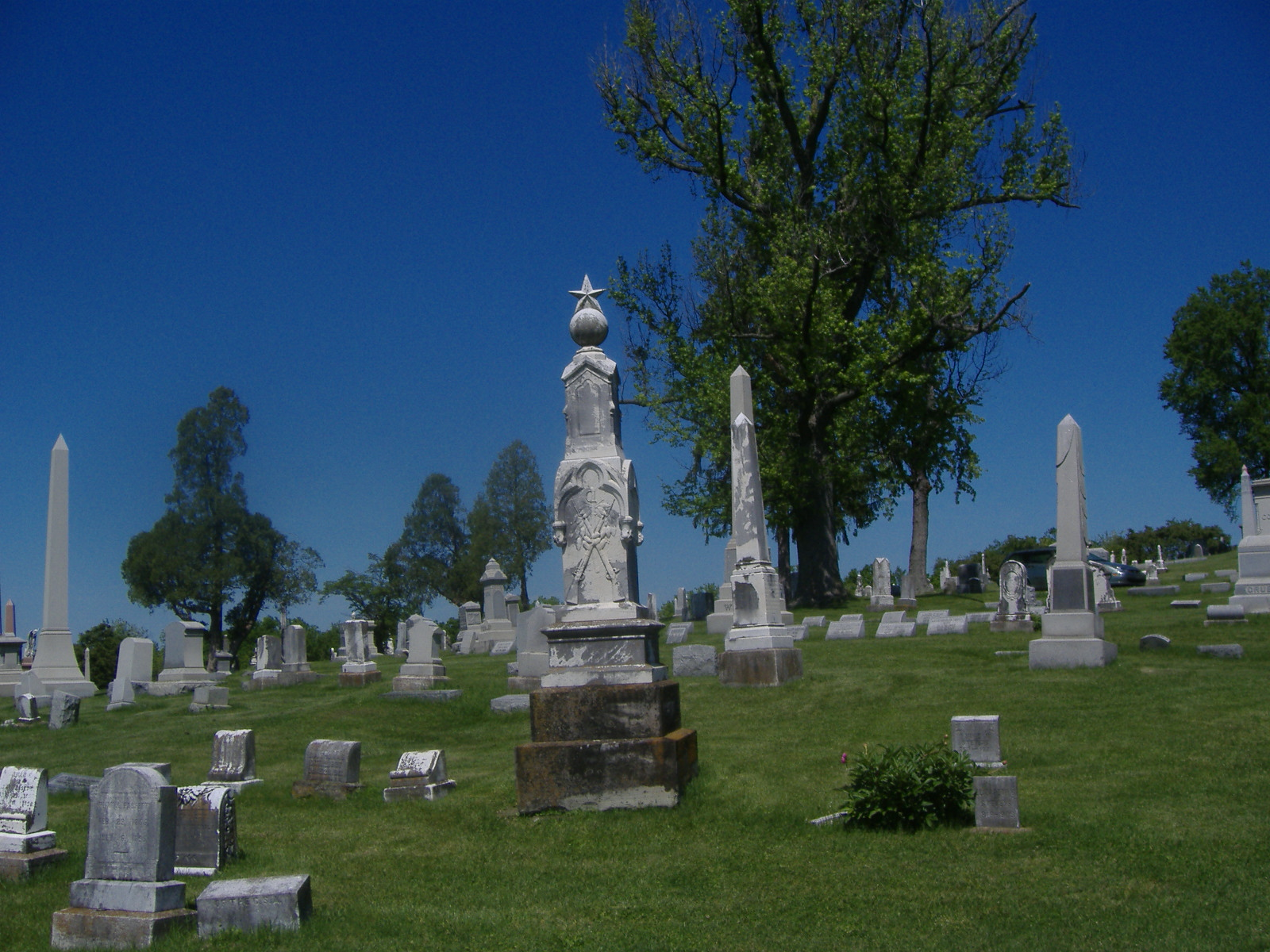

- Location within Kentucky Location within the United States
- Location: Machpelan Cemetery. 1.5 mi. E of jct. of US 460 and KY 713, Mt. Sterling, Kentucky
- Built: 1880
- MPS: Civil War Monuments of Kentucky MPS
- NRHP reference No.: 97000675
- Added to NRHP: July 17, 1997

The Confederate Monument in Mt. Sterling overlooking Mt. Sterling, Kentucky in Montgomery County, Kentucky, commemorates those who fought for the Confederate States of America. It is inscribed by passages from the Bivouac of the Dead.

On July 17, 1997, the Confederate Monument in Mt. Sterling was one of sixty-one different monuments related to the Civil War in Kentucky placed on the National Register of Historic Places, as part of the Civil War Monuments of Kentucky Multiple Property Submission.

== Gallery ==
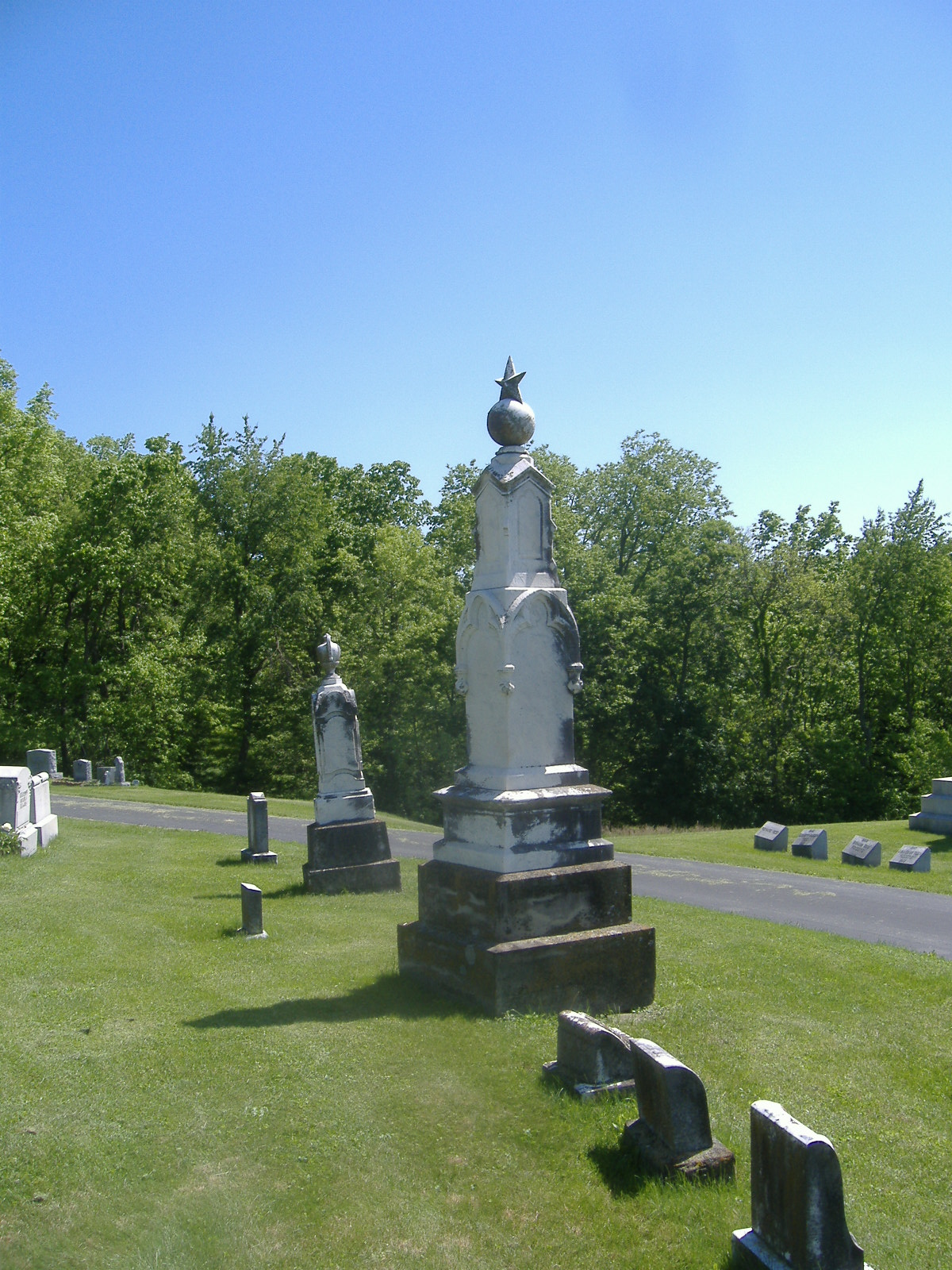

== See also ==
- Battle of Mt. Sterling (1864)
