= Flatboat =

Type of riverboat

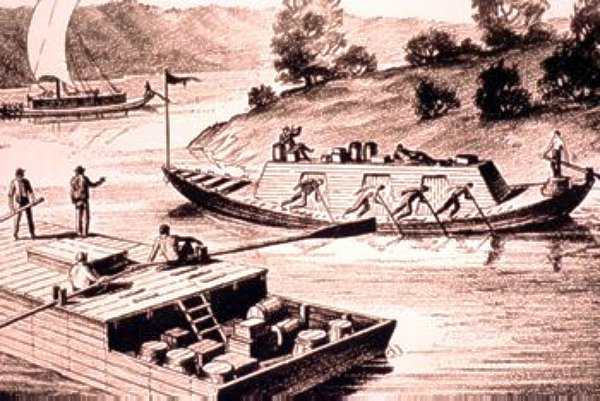
A flatboat passing a long cigar-shaped keelboat on the Ohio River.

A flatboat (or broadboat) was a rectangular flat-bottomed boat with square ends used to transport freight and passengers on inland waterways in the United States. The flatboat could be any size, but essentially it was a large, sturdy tub with a hull.

A flatboat was almost always a one-way (downstream) vessel, and was usually dismantled for lumber when it reached its destination.

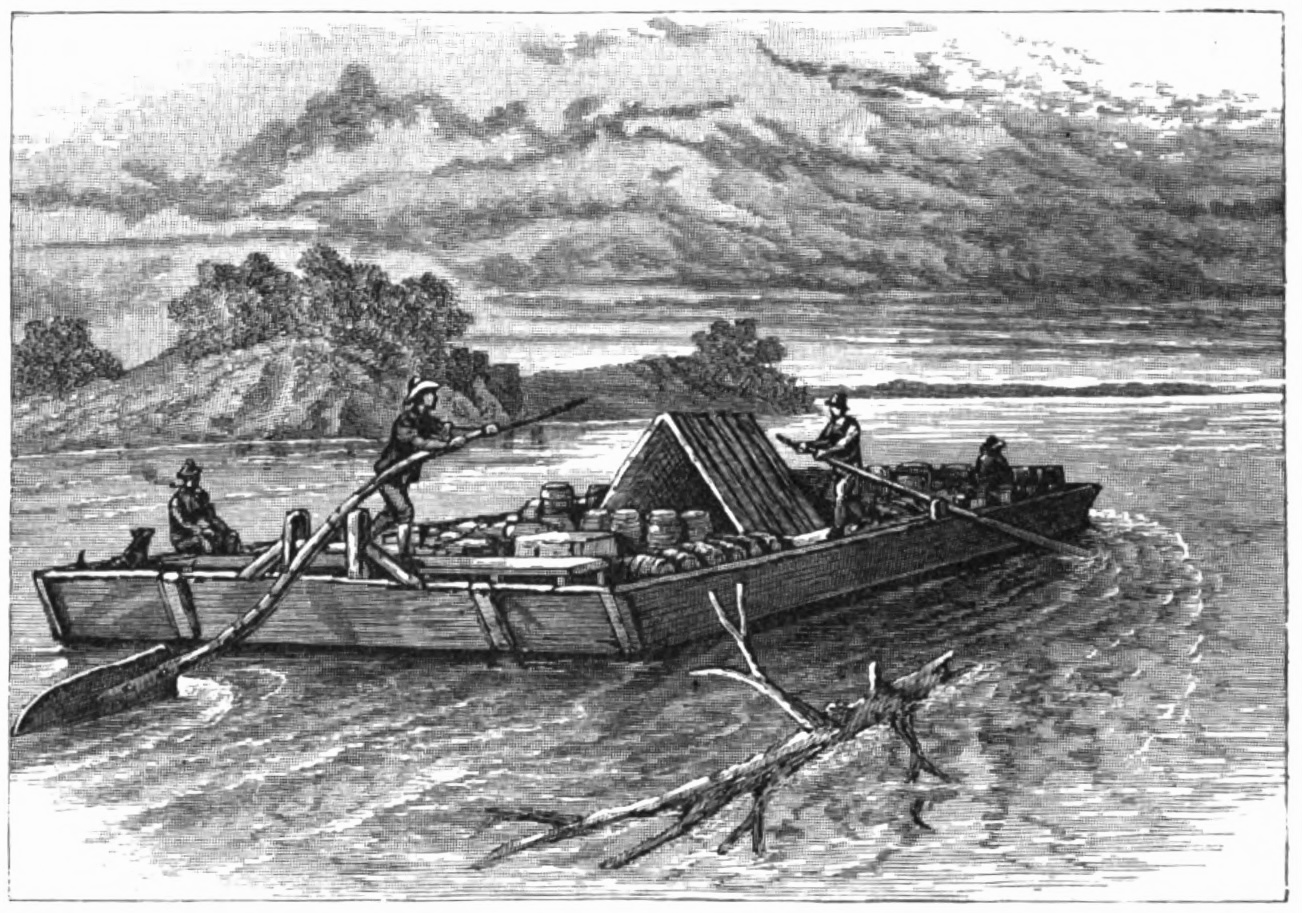
Flatboat on an American river in the 1800s carrying barrels of whiskey and food

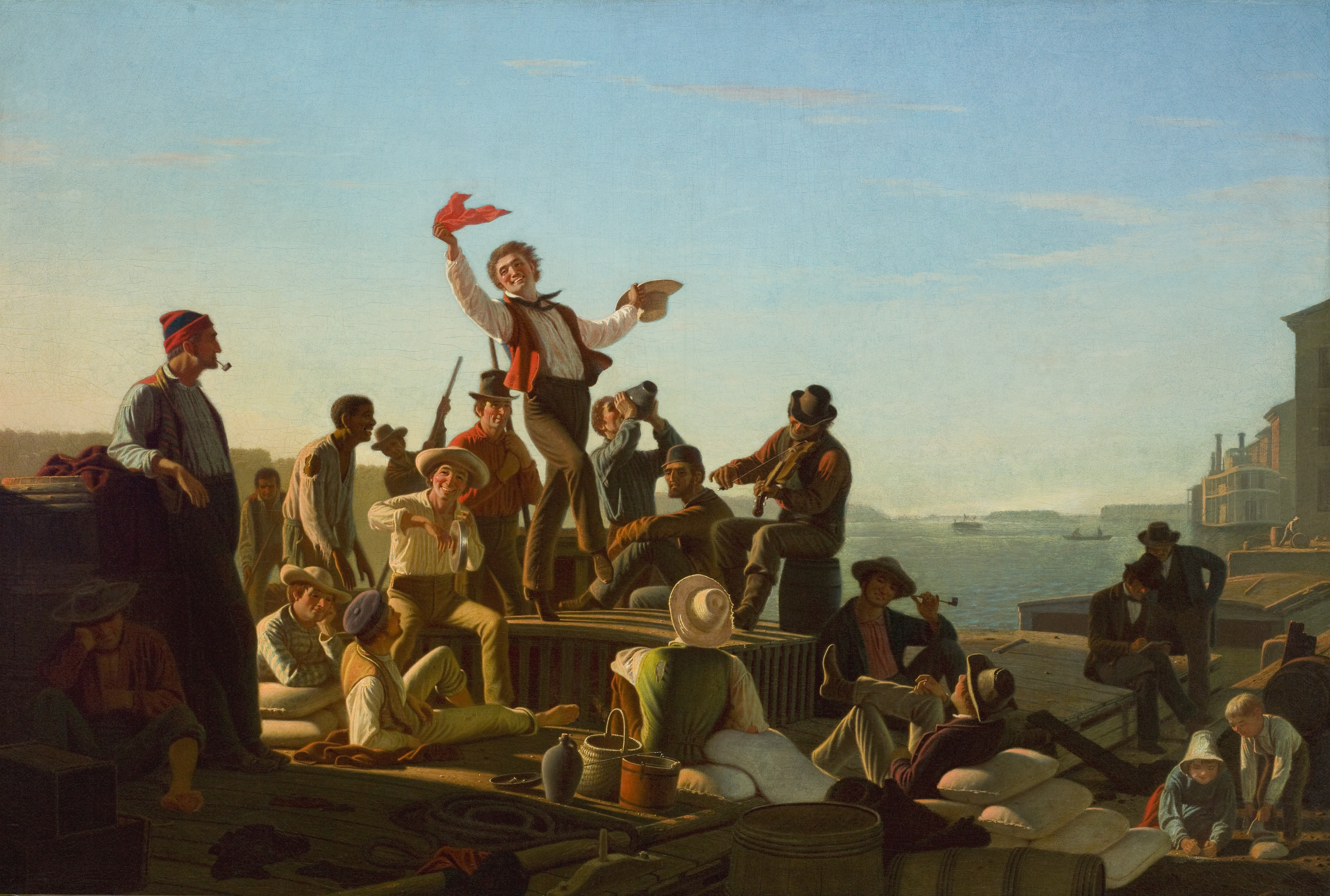
George Caleb Bingham, Jolly Flatboatmen in Port, (1857, St. Louis Art Museum)

== Early history ==
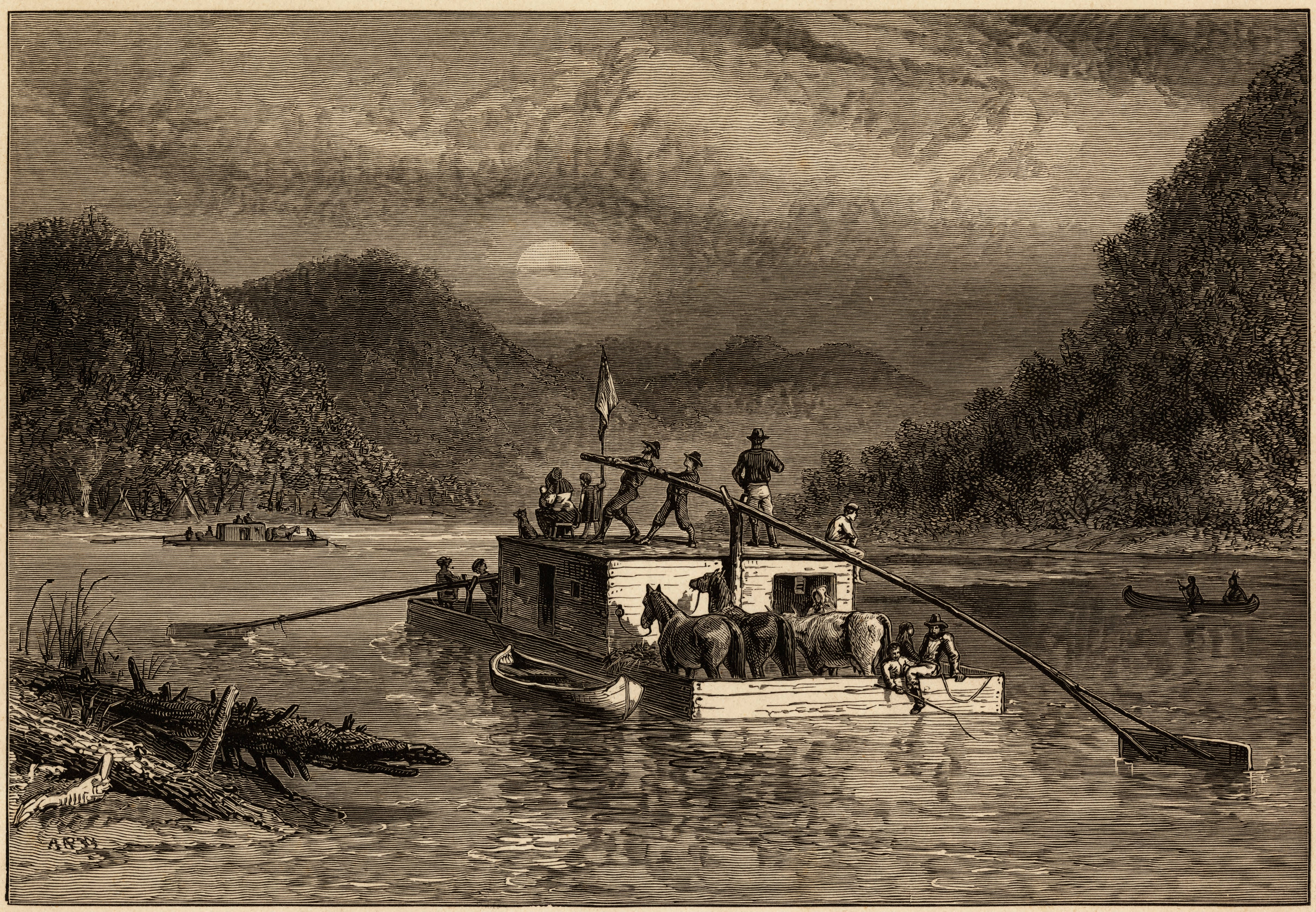
An Alfred Waud engraving showing persons traveling down a river by flatboat in the late 1800s.

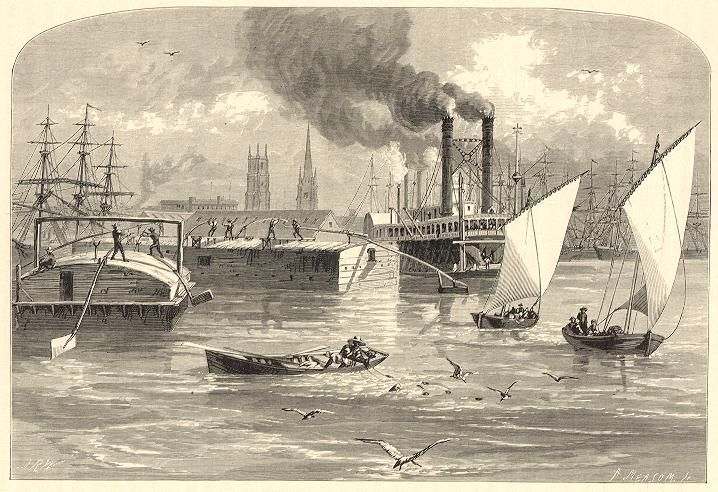
Flatboats among the river traffic at New Orleans, 1873

The flatboat trade first began in 1781, with Pennsylvania farmer Jacob Yoder building the first flatboat at Old Redstone Fort on the Monongahela River. Yoder's ancestors immigrated from Switzerland, where small barges called weidlings are still common today, having been used for hundreds of years to transport goods downriver. Yoder shipped flour down the Ohio River and Mississippi River to the port of New Orleans. Other flatboats would follow this model, using the current of the river to propel them to New Orleans where their final product could be shipped overseas. Through the antebellum era, flatboats were one of the most important modes of shipping in the United States.

The flatboat trade before the War of 1812 was less organized and less professional than during later times. Flatboats were generally built and piloted by the farmers whose crops they carried. They were limited to 20 feet (or approximately 6 meters) in width in order to successfully navigate the river, but could range from 20 to 100 feet (or approximately 6 to 30 meters) in length. Flatboats could be built by unskilled farmers with limited tools and training, which made them an ideal mode of transport for isolated farmers living in the Old Northwest and the Upper South. Farmers could make the journey down the river after the harvest. The boats themselves were usually salvaged for lumber at New Orleans, because they could not easily make the journey upriver. A boatman's return journey up the river was long and usually arduous. Passage on a (human-powered) keelboat was expensive and took weeks to make the journey up the Mississippi. Returning to the northern reaches on foot required about three months.

A flatboat itself was a serious investment for a Midwestern farmer. One generally cost about $75 to construct in 1800 (which was equivalent to $1,422.79 in 2025), but could carry up to $3,000 worth of goods. These flatboats could typically be salvaged for around $16 in New Orleans, recouping some of the initial investment. Flatboats carried a variety of goods to New Orleans, including agricultural products like corn, wheat, potatoes, flour, hay, tobacco, cotton, and whiskey. Livestock such as chickens, cows, and pigs also made their way down the Mississippi in flatboats. Indiana native May Espey Warren recalled that as a young girl she saw a flatboat loaded with thousands of chickens headed down the Mississippi. Other raw materials from the Old Northwest, like lumber and iron, were also sent down the Mississippi to be sold in New Orleans.

Many American cities along the river network of the Mississippi boomed due to the opportunities that the flatboat trade presented. New Orleans was the final destination for most flatboats headed down the Mississippi, and it was from there that most of the goods were shipped on the oceans. Cincinnati, another major American trading city, first built itself on the flatboat trade. Its large sawmills produced most of the heavy lumber sent downriver on flatboats, and it also became a large hub for the pork trade. Other cities, like Memphis, Tennessee and Brownsville, Pennsylvania became hubs for outfitting and supplying flatboat traders.

The flatboat trade also led to a series of cultural and regional exchanges between the North and the South. Many Northern flatboatmen had not seen the Deep South before, and rural farmers of the time generally did not travel. Flatboatmen brought tales of antebellum mansions lining the Mississippi and of the Cajun culture of lower Louisiana. They also brought back exotic foods such as bananas, and animals such as parrots. Abraham Lincoln served as a flatboatman twice, in 1828 and 1831. It was on these journeys that he first witnessed slavery, and in New Orleans he also saw a slave auction firsthand. Lincoln would later recall these journeys as essential in shaping his personal views on slavery and the slave trade.

=== Keelboats ===
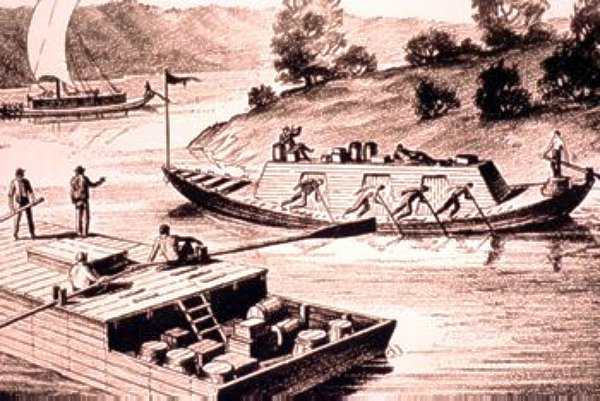
Barges twice: A long cigar-shaped keelboat passing a "flatboat" on the Ohio River.

A keel boat, keelboat, or keel-boat is a cargo-capable working boat. It had a shallow structural keel, was nearly flat-bottomed and often use leeboards if forced in open water. It was usually long, narrow cigar-shaped riverboat, or unsheltered water barge which is sometimes also called a poleboat—that is built about a slight keel and is designed as a boat built for the navigation of rivers, shallow lakes, and sometimes canals that were commonly used to transport cargo.

Keelboats were similar to riverboats, but like other barges were unpowered and were typically propelled and steered with oars or setting poles—usually the latter. Keelboats have been used for exploration, such as during the Lewis and Clark Expedition, but were primarily used to transport cargo or settlers in the early 19th century. The process of moving a keelboat upriver was extremely difficult, though current dependent.

==== Great Britain ====
The term keel was associated in Great Britain with three particular working boat types. The Norfolk Keel ancestor of the Norfolk Wherry, the Humber Keel and the Tyne Keel.

Keelboats played a central role, from the 13th century until the second half of the 20th century, in the movement of coal from northeast England to market. The mined coal was transported to the river Tyne where it was shipped downstream on keelboats manned by keelmen and controlled by the Newcastle Hostmen.

==== "Keel" as a unit of coal ====
A keel was a unit used to measure coal in the northeast of England, being the quantity of coal carried by a keelboat on the Tyne and Wear rivers. In 1750 it was said to be equal to 8 Newcastle chaldrons (waggons), a measure of volume, or a weight of 21 (long) tons 4 cwt (21.54 metric tons).

==== United States ====
In America they were used in great numbers by settlers making their way west in the century-plus of wide-open western American frontiers, ca. 1775–1890. They were also used extensively for transporting cargo to market, and for exploration and trading expeditions, for water transport was then most effective means to move bulky or heavy cargo.

Most of these keelboats were 50 to 80 feet (15 to 24 m) long and 15 feet (5 m) wide. They usually had a cabin in the middle or at the rear, but were sometimes constructed with an open deck.

Mike Fink is probably the most noted American keelboater in history.

Historical account of two keelboats published in the original Courier Journal of Lafayette, Indiana, in 1833:

We stop the press to announce the arrival this morning of the steam-boat, REPUBLICAN, Toll, Master from the rapids of the Wabash. The Republican had in tow keel boats, "the Hoosier Lady" and "the Hoosier Boy," bringing freight to Lafayette, Messrs Taylor & Harter, Taylor & Li J. McCormick, J. B. Seamen and Hunter, and for Messrs, Ewing of the Bridge at Logansport. This is the first arrival at Lafayette this year. We understand the Republican is going to try and ascend the Wabash at Logansport. If she is successful she be the first one that ever has been, and with entitlement to the premium, which we learn is been offered by General Tipton and other enterprising and worthy citizens of that first arrival. The Wabash is in steam boating condition, and we may experience several arrivals, in a few days.

== Advent of steamboats ==
The invention of the steamboat greatly reduced the costs of flatboat journeys, and caused the trade to boom through the antebellum period. Introduced to the Mississippi in the 1810s, the steamboat greatly reduced the time of the return journey for flatboat crews. After reaching New Orleans, many flatboat crews scuttled their craft and bought passage on steamboats upriver. What had once been a three-month hike for many flatboaters now took only days. These reduced labor costs saw flatboat operating costs plummet and profits boom. In some cases steamboats would also drag cargo-carrying flatboats upriver, allowing flatboat operators to profit on the return journey as well. These uses of steamboats caused the flatboat industry to grow from 598 arrivals in New Orleans in 1814 to 2,792 arrivals in 1847.

The steamboat also changed the nature of flatboat crews, making them more professional and more skilled. Returning upriver on steamboats allowed flatboat crews to make multiple journeys per year, which meant that a crew could earn a living wage simply by flatboating. These crews were known as "agent boatmen," as opposed to the earlier "dealer boatmen" or "peddler boatmen" for whom flatboating was only a seasonal job. This change ended up benefiting the flatboat industry significantly, because it seriously reduced wreckage and loss of cargo. River improvements also helped, and experienced flatboat crews were able to reduce cargo losses from $1,362,500 in 1822 to $381,000 in 1832.

== Decline ==
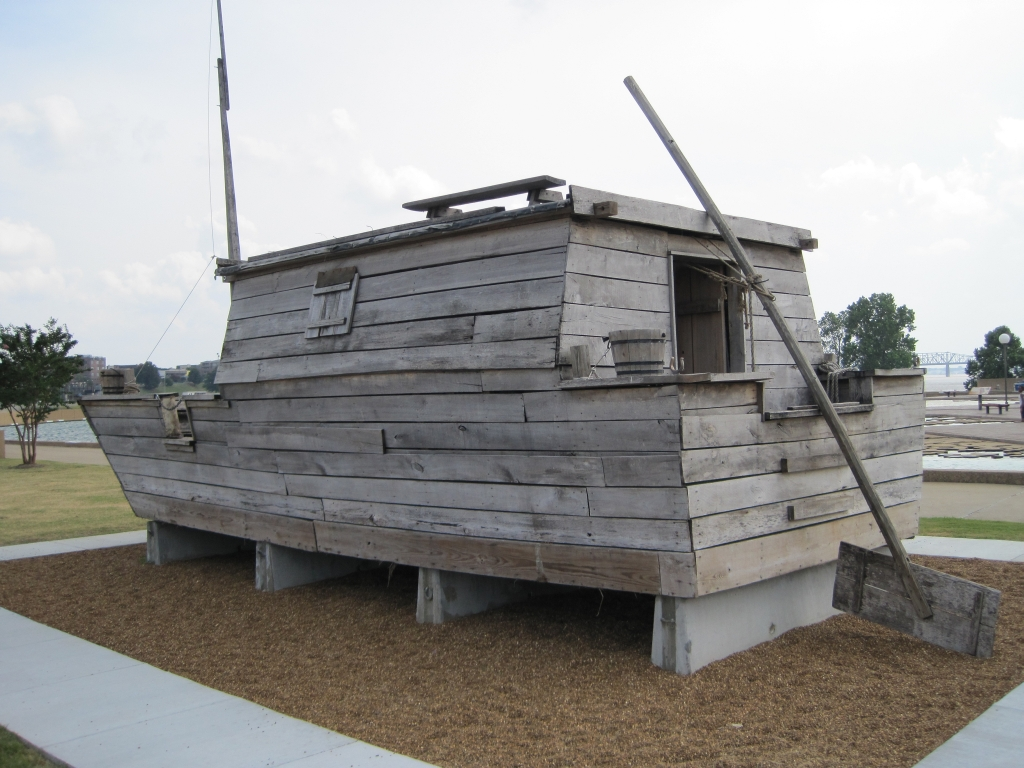
Modern replica of an old-time flatboat, located at Mud Island, Tennessee

The flatboat trade stayed vigorous and lucrative throughout the antebellum period, aided by steamboats (and later by railroads) in returning crews upriver. However, these same technologies, which earlier had made the flatboat trade significantly more efficient, would eventually overtake the flatboat trade along the Mississippi and render flatboats obsolete. Steamboats and railroads simply carried freight much more quickly than flatboats, and could bring cargo upriver as well as downriver. By 1857, only 541 flatboats reached New Orleans, down from 2,792 in 1847, and also fewer than the 598 flatboats that had traveled down the Mississippi in 1814.

== See also ==
- Barge
- Boat
- Galiot
- Narrow boat
- Punt
- Pünte
- Redstone Old Fort
- Mississippi River Squadron, where flat bottom vessels were extensively used during the American Civil War.
