= Beechland (Taylorsville, Kentucky) =

- U.S. National Register of Historic Places
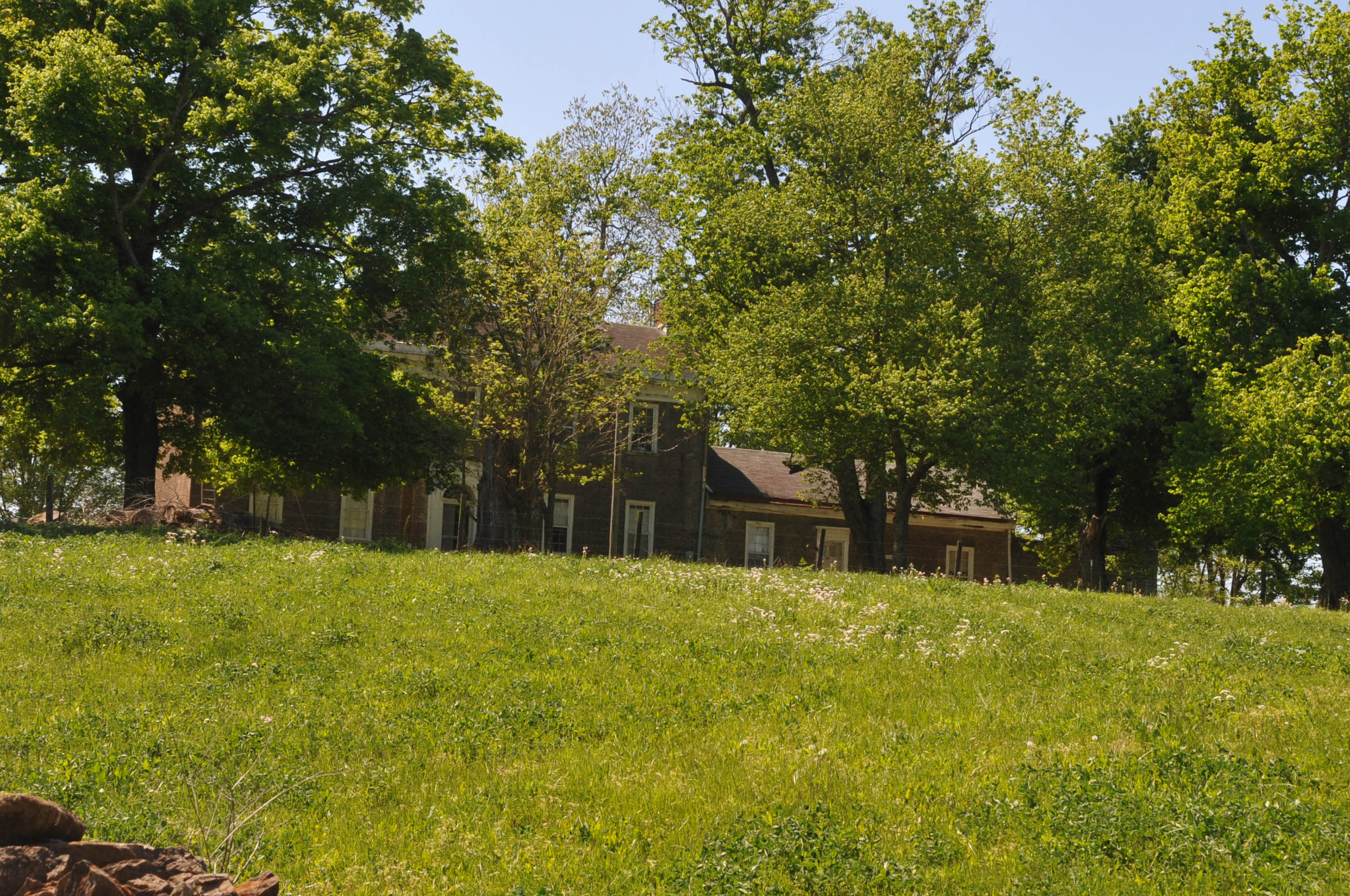

- Location within Kentucky Location within the United States
- Location: 2.5 miles (4.0 km) north of Taylorsville, Kentucky
- Coordinates: 38°03′39″N 85°20′23″W
- Area: 5 acres (2.0 ha)
- Built: 1804
- Built by: Jacob Yoder
- NRHP reference No.: 76000945
- Added to NRHP: November 7, 1976

Beechland, near Taylorsville, Kentucky, was built in 1804. It was built by Jacob Yoder and has also been known as Jacob Yoder House. The listing included four contributing buildings.

Jacob Yoder was a Revolutionary War soldier and innovative merchant-trader, was "the first entrepreneur to take a load of goods down the Ohio and Mississippi Rivers on a flat boat from Pennsylvania to New Orleans."

== See also ==
- Beechland (Jeffersontown, Kentucky), built in 1812 and also NRHP-listed
