= Confederate Martyrs Monument in Jeffersontown =

- U.S. National Register of Historic Places
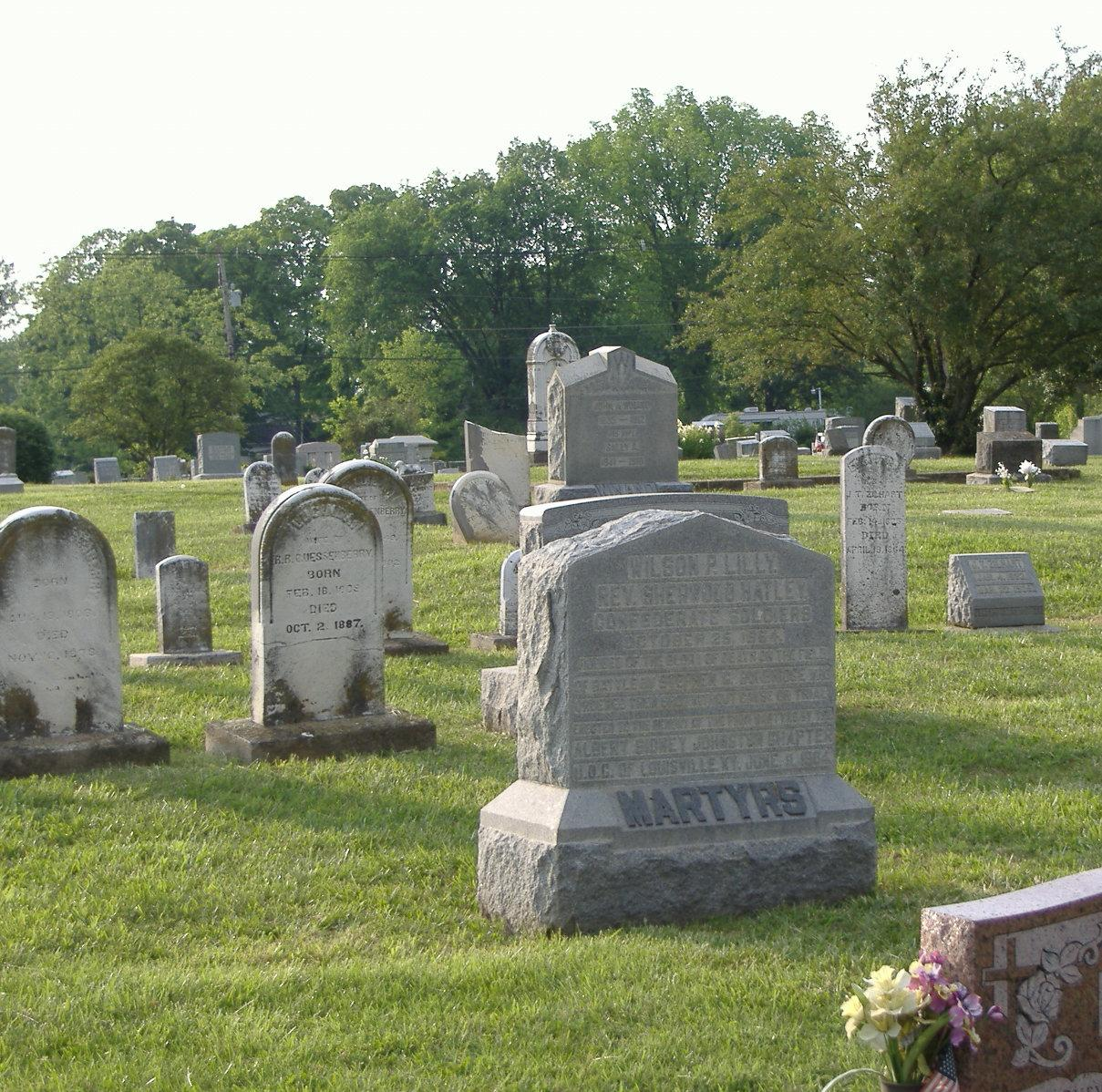

- Location within Kentucky Location within the United States
- Location: Jeffersontown, Kentucky
- Coordinates: 38°11′31″N 85°34′06″W
- Built: 1904
- MPS: Civil War Monuments of Kentucky MPS
- NRHP reference No.: 97000691
- Added to NRHP: July 17, 1997

The Confederate Martyrs Monument at the Jeffersontown City Cemetery in Jeffersontown, Kentucky, United States, marks where four Confederate soldiers were executed "without cause or trial". Their execution was under Order 59, created by Union General Stephen G. Burbridge, known as "Butcher Burbridge" in Kentucky, which called for the execution of four Confederate prisoners for every unarmed Union citizen killed. The total number of executions performed as a result of this order was fifty. The four soldiers commemorated on the stone were Wilson P. Lilly, Rev. Sherwood Hatley, Lindsey Duke Buckner and M. Blincoe.

== History ==
The execution of the four Confederate soldiers was the only significant event of the American Civil War in Jeffersontown. It was done in retaliation for the extrajudicial murder of a Union soldier on Bardstown Pike, as was common during the Civil War. The soldiers were shot while confined, and their bodies were dumped in a ditch until their interment here.

The monument was placed on the National Register of Historic Places on July 17, 1997, the same day as the Louisville Confederate Monument and the Union Monument in Louisville. The Confederate Soldiers Martyrs Monument in Eminence, Kentucky, that was also established to honor victims of Order 59, was also established on the same day.

== Inscriptions ==
The monument was erected by the Albert Sidney Johnston chapter of the United Daughters of the Confederacy (U.D.C).

The inscription on the front reads:

Wilson P. Lilly.
Rev. Sherwood Hatley.
Confederate soldiers
October 25, 1864.
Robbed of the glory of death on the field
of battle by Stephen G. Burbridge who
ordered them shot without cause or trial
Erected to the memory of the four martyrs by the
Albert Sidney Johnston chapter
U.D.C. of Louisville, Ky. June. 11, 1904.
Martyrs

On the back it reads:

Wilson P. Lilly.
Sherwood Hatley.
Lindsey Duke Buckner.
M. Blincoe.
Being dead yet speaketh.

== Gallery ==
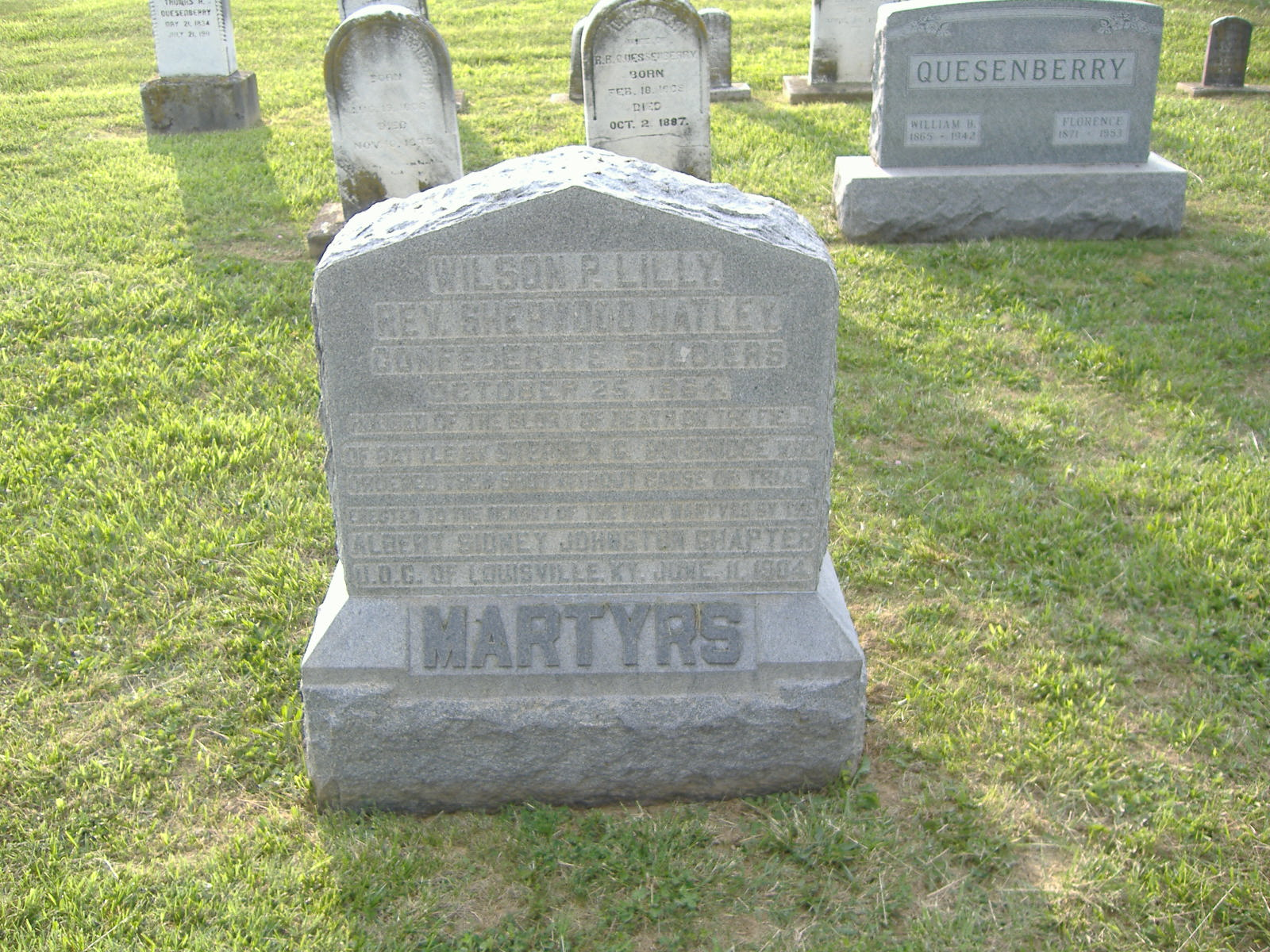
Front view of monument

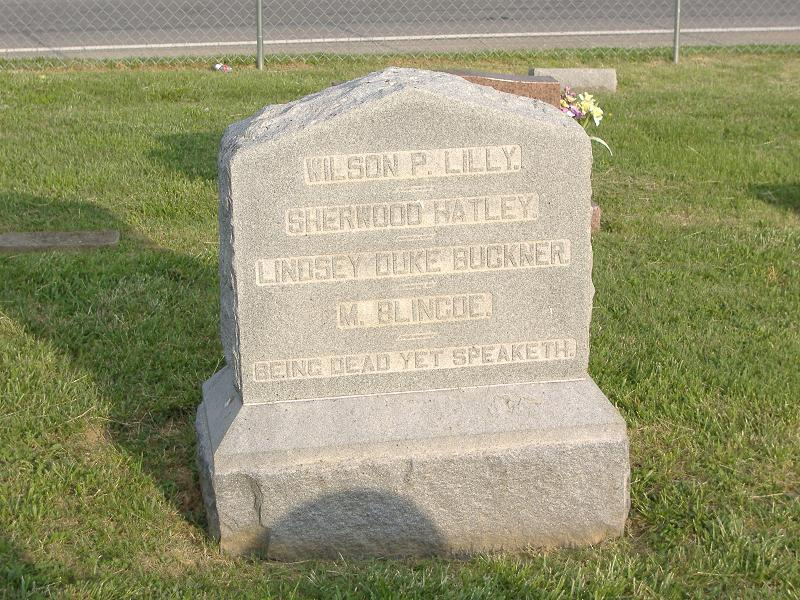
Back view of the monument

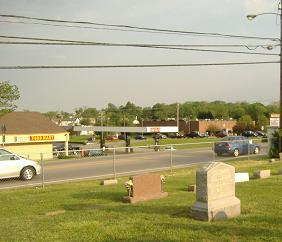
View of monument and the closest street

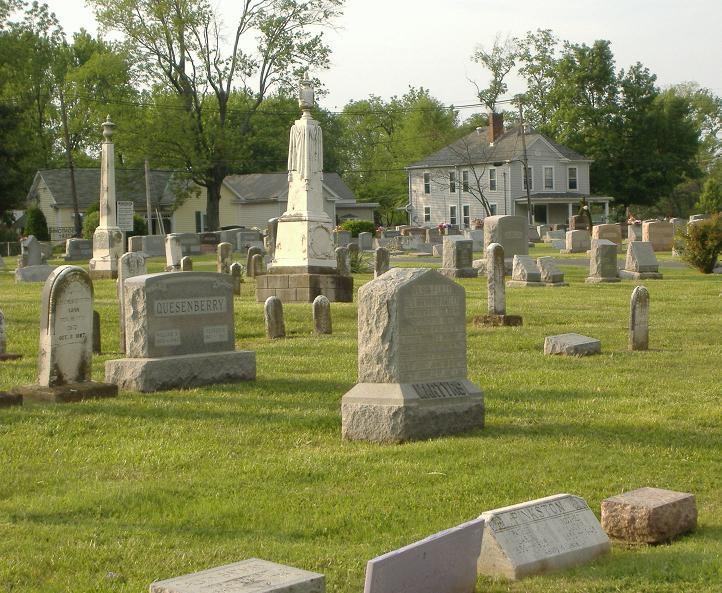
View of the monument and the farther street

== See also ==
- Louisville, Kentucky, in the American Civil War
- National Register of Historic Places listings in Jefferson County, Kentucky
