= Great Hog Swindle =

Program during the American Civil War

- Date: September–December 1864
- Location: Kentucky, United States
- Also known as: Great Kentucky Hog Swindle
- Type: Military procurement controversy
- Theme: Union Army pork purchasing program
- Motive: Reduce the cost of supplying salt pork to Union troops
- Participants: Union Army, Kentucky hog farmers, pork packers, livestock traders
- Outcome: Approximately 56,000 hogs purchased; controversy over prices paid to farmers; program discontinued in December 1864
- Casualties: None

The Great Hog Swindle is the popular name given to a program in 1864 during the American Civil War in which the Union Army purchased hogs from Kentucky farmers to feed their troops.

The hog purchase program was devised by Major Henry C. Symonds when commodity speculation caused a crisis in the salt pork market. The program entailed army commissary officers buying hogs directly from farmers. The program was deemed a disaster because the farmers collectively lost $300,000.

== Symonds' plan ==
Symonds first considered setting his plan into action in 1862. However, he took no action until 1863, when he informed Brigadier General Joseph Pannell Taylor, head of the subsistence office, that he could pack 15 million pounds of meat in an unused city porkhouse. Symonds estimated that the army could buys live hogs for four and a half cents a pound and pack them for no more than five cents per pound. This program would theoretically save the U.S. Government $150,000. However, Symond's proposal received little support.

In November 1863, pork trade journals circulated reports of a hog shortage, making both packers and dealers uneasy. A month later, however, provision merchants began to speculate in mess pork for the army. Prices began to slowly rise, and then quickly increased. In September 1863, the price of mess pork was just $17. The price had risen to $32 by the end of May 1864. By midsummer 1864, the pork situation had become critical for the army. Symonds took this second chance to propose his project. General Amos Beebe Eaton immediately took up the project.

On September 13, Symonds and several other parties offered to buy and kill hogs, provide slat and barrels, and to pack the meat for the army for $4.35 per hog. However, Symonds believed that he could pack the meat for the army at just $3.00 per hog and was set to prove it. By the end of September, Symonds was ready to enter the hog business singlehandedly.

== In action ==
When there were rumors that the hog drovers planned to drive all of Kentucky's hogs into Ohio, Symonds convinced General Stephen G. Burbridge, commander of the District of Kentucky, to order that shippers possess a permit in order to send any hogs out of state. This forced the Kentucky farmers to sell their hogs to the government. Publication of Burbridge's transportation order brought hordes of angry packers to the Louisville commissary office. Nobody but the army's packers could pack meat in Kentucky that season. Most of Kentucky blamed Burbridge for the project.

Symonds soon hired six agents to buy hogs for the army. They had instructions from him to only pay eight cents per pound. Within ten days, the army agents had purchased several thousand hogs at just seven and a half to eight cents per pound. When the drovers and farmers learned that hogs in the Louisville market were bringing in ten and a half cents per pound, they protested. They cried that the army had taken the hogs by force for an unfair price. Several newspapers took up the cry and demanded the dismissal of Symonds’ agents. In retaliation to the army, some packers and drovers filled the newspaper with tales of the “Hog Swindle” and spread malicious rumors.

Kilburn later removed all the restrictions on railroads and steamboats. However, he could not counter Burbridge's order restricting transportation and could not free the hog trade.

By November 20, Louisville packers opened a drive to get rid of Symonds. However, despite them contacting their congressman and the governor sending a committee, no action was taken. Symonds soon became aware of the efforts against him and fired his original contractors and agreed to accept hogs directly from holders after November 17. The army then raised its offer to nine cents per pound for hogs delivered in Louisville. Kentucky farmers now showed a greater willingness to sell their hogs to the army.

On November 23, Symonds was instructed to have Burbridge revoke all transportation restrictions. When the price of hogs jumped two cents per pound, Symonds asserted that the packers’ ring had made $300,000. The fierce competition had forced army contractors to raise their prices from nine cents to eleven cents per pound. Symonds eventually gave up the fight in Kentucky, but he stayed in the market until December 9. His new buyers had collected 33,000 Kentucky hogs. Symonds also turned to the packers of Indiana, who added another 23,000 hogs to the army's pork supply by Christmas.

== Aftermath ==
The army obtained eight million pounds of salt pork - 29,130 barrels for $34 per barrel - and a number of pork byproducts. Even while the project was shutting down, pork sold for $39 per barrel. Symonds bragged about how he had saved the government $200,000, but the Kentucky Governor said otherwise, stating that Symonds and his agents had stolen $300,000 from Kentucky farmers.
