= KEAS Tabernacle Christian Methodist Episcopal Church =

Historic church in Kentucky, United States

- U.S. National Register of Historic Places
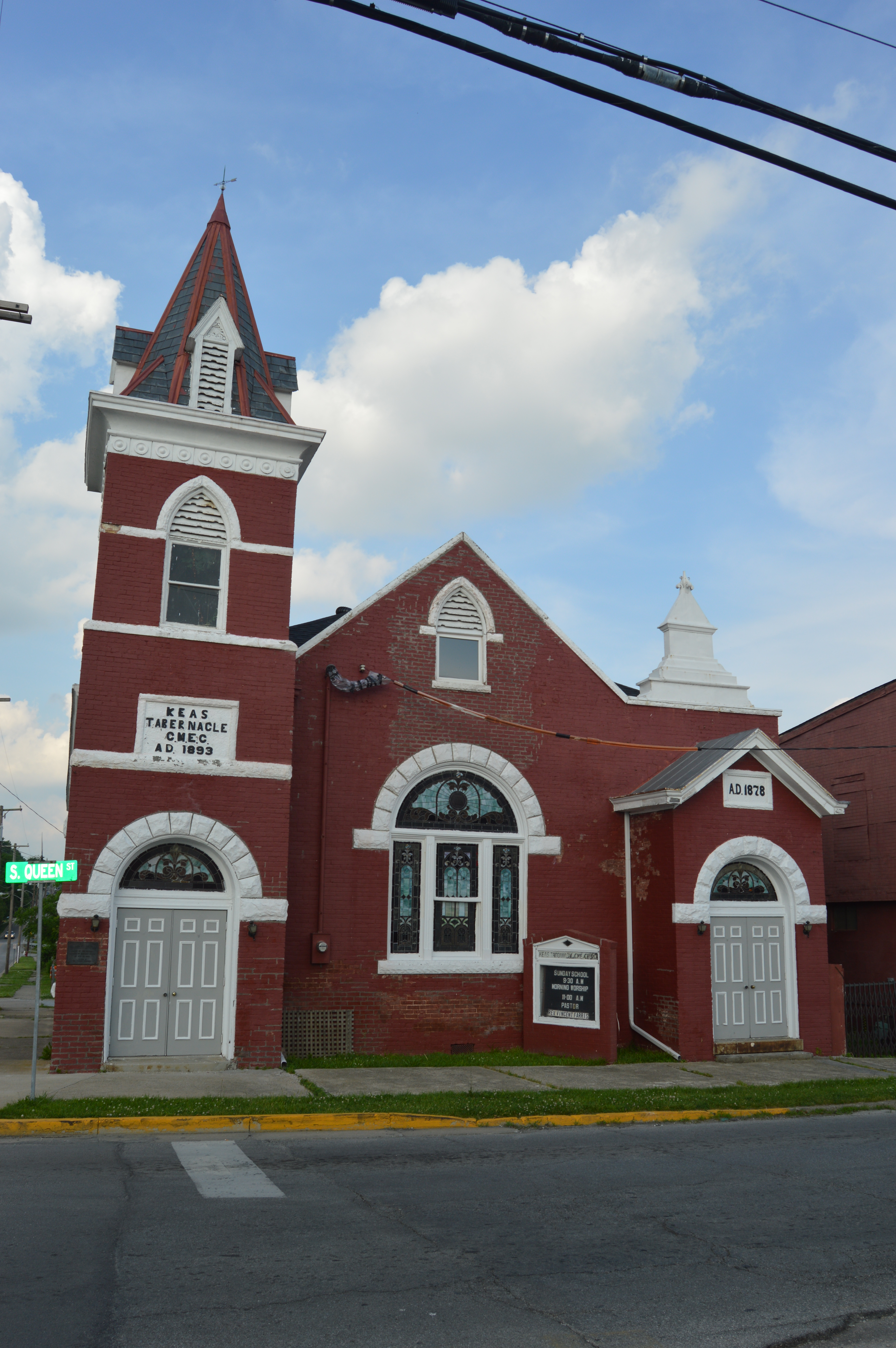
- Front, with Locust St. to the left

- Location within Kentucky Location within the United States
- Location: 101 S. Queen St., Mount Sterling, Kentucky
- Coordinates: 38°3′21″N 83°56′19″W
- Area: 0.5 acres (0.20 ha)
- Built: 1893
- Architectural style: Romanesque Revival
- NRHP reference No.: 83002836
- Added to NRHP: May 26, 1983

The KEAS Tabernacle Christian Methodist Episcopal Church is a historic Christian Methodist Episcopal church at 101 S. Queen Street in Mount Sterling, Kentucky. It was built in 1893 and added to the National Register in 1983.

It is a late vernacular example of Romanesque Revival architecture.
