= Mount Sterling, Kentucky =

- City
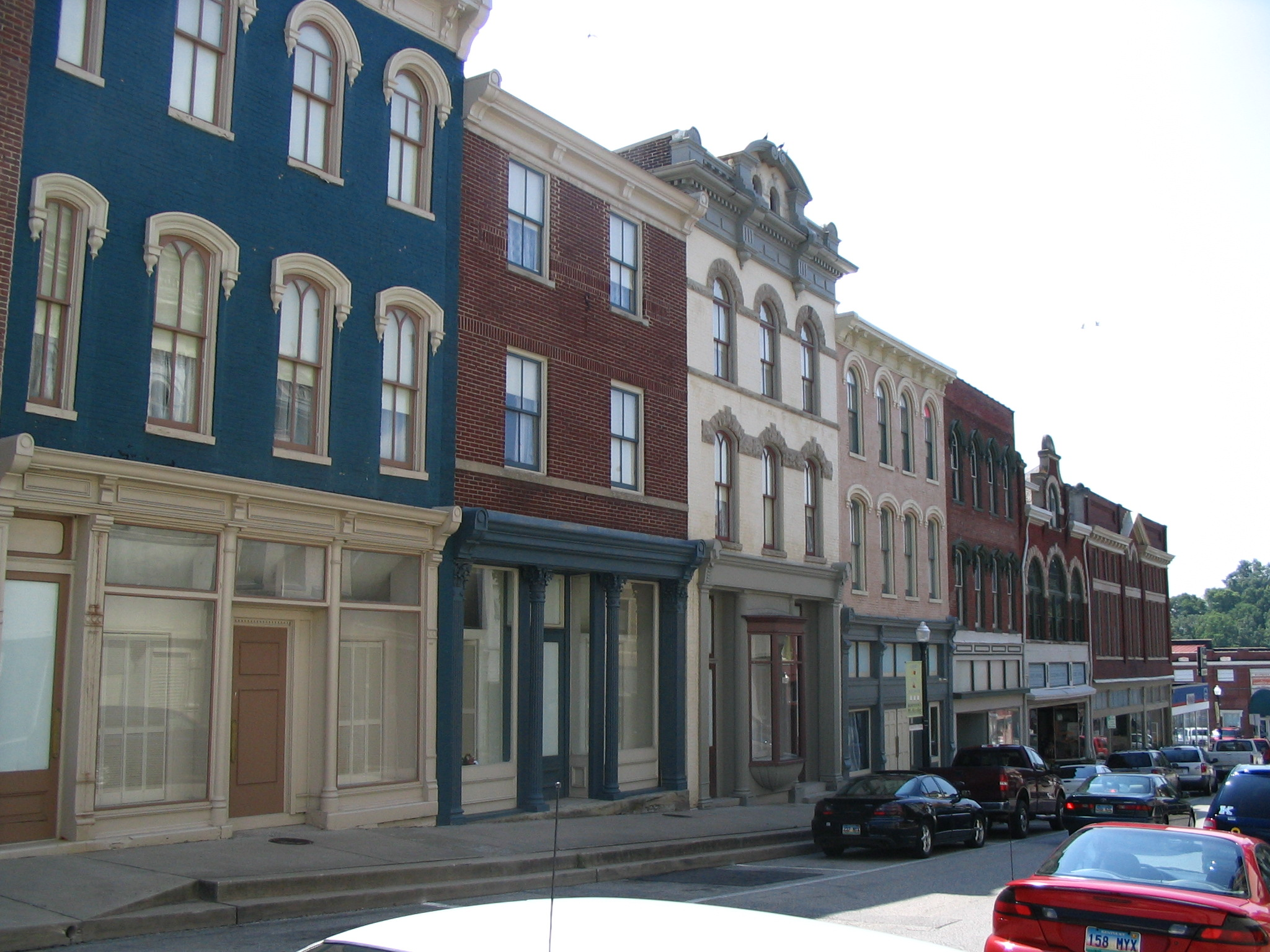
- Downtown Mt. Sterling
- Motto: "Ringing with Unity and Pride"
- Location in Montgomery County, Kentucky
- Coordinates: 38°3′24″N 83°56′40″W
- Country: United States
- State: Kentucky
- County: Montgomery
- Established: 1792
- Incorporated: 1852

Government
  - Mayor: Al Botts (Ind.)

Area
  - Total: 4.51 sq mi (11.68 km^{2})
  - Land: 4.49 sq mi (11.62 km^{2})
  - Water: 0.023 sq mi (0.06 km^{2})
- Elevation: 974 ft (297 m)

Population (2020)
  - Total: 7,558
  - Estimate (2025): 7,586
  - Density: 1,684.0/sq mi (650.19/km^{2})
- Time zone: UTC-5 (Eastern (EST))
  - Summer (DST): UTC-4 (EDT)
- ZIP code: 40353
- Area code: 859
- FIPS code: 21-54084
- GNIS feature ID: 0498865
- Website: mtsterling.ky.gov

Mount Sterling, often written as Mt. Sterling, is a home rule-class city in Montgomery County, Kentucky, United States. The population was 7,558 as of the 2020 census, up from 6,895 in 2010. It is the county seat of Montgomery County and the principal city of the Mount Sterling micropolitan area.

== History ==
Mount Sterling is named for an ancient burial mound called "Little Mountain", and for the town of Stirling in Scotland. It was named by the first developer of the area, Hugh Forbes. The Kentucky Assembly passed an act in 1792 establishing the town as Mt. Sterling, a misspelling which was retained.

The area was originally part of the thick wilderness of central Kentucky. Explorers, hunters, and surveyors traveling along a trail called Old Harper's Trace noted a 125-foot-high (38 m) tree-covered mound which they called "the Little Mountain". Later excavations showed it to be a burial site. The site of the mound is now the intersection of Queen and Locust streets in Mt. Sterling.

The first cabin in the area was built in 1779. The first permanent settlement was established around 1790, when Forbes began to sell lots and laid out a road, now Locust Street. In 1796 the town was established as the county seat of newly created Montgomery County. At that time the town consisted of 33 town lots, four retail stores, and three taverns. A courthouse was built, the first of seven to be housed in Mt. Sterling. A jail and a town pump were also installed. A large brick market house where farm produce was bought and sold confirmed the town as the commercial center of the surrounding area. Baptist, Presbyterian and Methodist churches were established during the town's first decade.

During the Civil War the town was occupied alternately by Union and Confederate troops on multiple occasions. The Battle of Mount Sterling in June 1864, which ended in a Confederate defeat, was the last of the fighting in Montgomery County.

== Geography ==
Mt. Sterling is located northwest of the center of Montgomery County at 38°3′24″N 83°56′40″W (38.056613, -83.944500). It is 34 miles (55 km) east of Lexington and 91 miles (146 km) west of Huntington, West Virginia. U.S. Route 60 passes through the city as Main Street, leading northeast 14 miles (23 km) to Owingsville and west-southwest 16 miles (26 km) to Winchester. U.S. Route 460 crosses US 60 in the center of Mt. Sterling, leading northwest 23 miles (37 km) to Paris and southeast 21 miles (34 km) to Frenchburg. Kentucky Route 11 joins US 460 through the center of Mt. Sterling but leads north 31 miles (50 km) to Flemingsburg and south 15 miles (24 km) to Clay City. Interstate 64 passes through the northern part of Mt. Sterling, with access from exits 110 (US 460) and 113 (US 60), and connecting Mt. Sterling with Lexington and Huntington.

According to the United States Census Bureau, Mt. Sterling has a total area of 4.52 square miles (11.71 km^{2}), of which 0.02 square miles (0.05 km^{2}), or 0.49%, are water. Hinkston Creek runs through the city center, flowing north and then west to the South Fork of the Licking River in northern Bourbon County.

=== Climate ===
The climate in this area is characterized by hot, humid summers and generally cool to cold winters. According to the Köppen Climate Classification system, Mt. Sterling has a humid subtropical climate, abbreviated "Cfa" on climate maps. Under the Trewartha climate classification system, Mt. Sterling has a hot-summer humid continental climate, abbreviated "Dca", bordering very closely on a temperate oceanic climate (abbreviated "Do") with January average temperatures just 0.3 °F (0.2 °C) below freezing, due to the insufficient growing season length to qualify as a subtropical climate under Trewartha.

Climate data for Mount Sterling, Kentucky (1991–2020 normals, extremes 1892–present)
Month	Jan	Feb	Mar	Apr	May	Jun	Jul	Aug	Sep	Oct	Nov	Dec	Year
Record high °F (°C)	80 (27)	80 (27)	89 (32)	92 (33)	98 (37)	104 (40)	110 (43)	105 (41)	104 (40)	97 (36)	83 (28)	78 (26)	110 (43)
Mean maximum °F (°C)	65.2 (18.4)	69.5 (20.8)	75.7 (24.3)	82.4 (28.0)	87.9 (31.1)	92.8 (33.8)	94.8 (34.9)	93.5 (34.2)	91.6 (33.1)	84.2 (29.0)	74.3 (23.5)	66.3 (19.1)	96.6 (35.9)
Mean daily maximum °F (°C)	41.8 (5.4)	45.6 (7.6)	55.7 (13.2)	66.8 (19.3)	75.6 (24.2)	83.4 (28.6)	86.5 (30.3)	85.7 (29.8)	80.1 (26.7)	68.5 (20.3)	55.9 (13.3)	45.4 (7.4)	65.9 (18.8)
Daily mean °F (°C)	31.7 (−0.2)	34.5 (1.4)	43.1 (6.2)	53.3 (11.8)	63.1 (17.3)	71.2 (21.8)	74.8 (23.8)	73.1 (22.8)	66.6 (19.2)	55.0 (12.8)	43.6 (6.4)	35.2 (1.8)	53.8 (12.1)
Mean daily minimum °F (°C)	21.6 (−5.8)	23.5 (−4.7)	30.5 (−0.8)	39.8 (4.3)	50.6 (10.3)	59.0 (15.0)	63.1 (17.3)	60.6 (15.9)	53.1 (11.7)	41.6 (5.3)	31.3 (−0.4)	25.0 (−3.9)	41.6 (5.3)
Mean minimum °F (°C)	2.1 (−16.6)	4.6 (−15.2)	13.3 (−10.4)	24.3 (−4.3)	35.6 (2.0)	46.4 (8.0)	53.5 (11.9)	49.7 (9.8)	40.3 (4.6)	27.7 (−2.4)	16.4 (−8.7)	9.6 (−12.4)	−1.9 (−18.8)
Record low °F (°C)	−20 (−29)	−27 (−33)	−12 (−24)	18 (−8)	26 (−3)	39 (4)	42 (6)	43 (6)	25 (−4)	15 (−9)	−8 (−22)	−20 (−29)	−27 (−33)
Average precipitation inches (mm)	3.52 (89)	3.66 (93)	4.36 (111)	4.40 (112)	4.53 (115)	4.80 (122)	5.38 (137)	3.36 (85)	3.61 (92)	3.22 (82)	3.38 (86)	4.28 (109)	48.50 (1,232)
Average snowfall inches (cm)	3.3 (8.4)	2.0 (5.1)	2.2 (5.6)	0.0 (0.0)	0.0 (0.0)	0.0 (0.0)	0.0 (0.0)	0.0 (0.0)	0.0 (0.0)	0.0 (0.0)	0.2 (0.51)	1.1 (2.8)	8.8 (22)
Average precipitation days (≥ 0.01 in)	11.7	11.3	12.9	12.8	12.5	11.9	11.6	9.4	8.9	9.2	9.7	12.0	133.9
Average snowy days (≥ 0.1 in)	2.1	1.7	1.0	0.0	0.0	0.0	0.0	0.0	0.0	0.0	0.2	0.7	5.7
Source: NOAA

== Demographics ==
Historical population
Census	Pop.	Note	%±
1800	83		—
1810	325		291.6%
1830	561		—
1840	585		4.3%
1850	533		−8.9%
1860	744		39.6%
1870	1,040		39.8%
1880	2,087		100.7%
1890	3,629		73.9%
1900	3,561		−1.9%
1910	3,932		10.4%
1920	3,995		1.6%
1930	4,350		8.9%
1940	4,782		9.9%
1950	5,294		10.7%
1960	5,370		1.4%
1970	5,083		−5.3%
1980	5,820		14.5%
1990	5,362		−7.9%
2000	5,876		9.6%
2010	6,895		17.3%
2020	7,558		9.6%
2025 (est.)	7,586		0.4%
U.S. Decennial Census

=== 2020 census ===
As of the 2020 census, Mount Sterling had a population of 7,558. The median age was 37.9 years. 23.4% of residents were under the age of 18 and 16.8% were 65 years of age or older. For every 100 females there were 90.2 males, and for every 100 females age 18 and over there were 86.1 males age 18 and over.

96.4% of residents lived in urban areas, while 3.6% lived in rural areas.

There were 3,142 households, of which 30.6% had children under the age of 18 living in them. Of all households, 38.5% were married-couple households, 17.7% were households with a male householder and no spouse or partner present, and 34.8% were households with a female householder and no spouse or partner present. About 33.8% of all households were made up of individuals, and 16.1% had someone living alone who was 65 years of age or older.

There were 3,524 housing units, of which 10.8% were vacant. The homeowner vacancy rate was 1.5% and the rental vacancy rate was 7.4%.

Racial composition as of the 2020 census
Race	Number	Percent
White	6,612	87.5%
Black or African American	358	4.7%
American Indian and Alaska Native	23	0.3%
Asian	80	1.1%
Native Hawaiian and Other Pacific Islander	0	0.0%
Some other race	119	1.6%
Two or more races	366	4.8%
Hispanic or Latino (of any race)	252	3.3%

=== 2000 census ===
As of the census of 2000, there were 5,876 people, 2,478 households, and 1,536 families residing in the city. The population density was 1,708.9 inhabitants per square mile (659.8/km^{2}). There were 2,768 housing units at an average density of 805.0 per square mile (310.8/km^{2}). The racial makeup of the city was 89.09% White, 8.73% African American, 0.22% Native American, 0.19% Asian, 0.75% from other races, and 1.02% from two or more races. Hispanic or Latino people of any race were 1.68% of the population.

There were 2,478 households, out of which 28.9% had children under the age of 18 living with them, 44.8% were married couples living together, 14.2% had a female householder with no husband present, and 38.0% were non-families. 33.3% of all households were made up of individuals, and 17.4% had someone living alone who was 65 years of age or older. The average household size was 2.28 and the average family size was 2.89.

In the city, the population was spread out, with 22.7% under the age of 18, 10.6% from 18 to 24, 28.4% from 25 to 44, 21.0% from 45 to 64, and 17.4% who were 65 years of age or older. The median age was 37 years. For every 100 females, there were 86.0 males. For every 100 females age 18 and over, there were 83.1 males.

The median income for a household in the city was $27,050, and the median income for a family was $54,074. Males had a median income of $30,584 versus $21,081 for females. The per capita income for the city was $17,585. About 17.1% of families and 19.4% of the population were below the poverty line, including 29.4% of those under age 18 and 17.8% of those age 65 or over.

== Arts and culture ==
Beginning in the eighteenth century, Court Day quickly became the annual trading day for the area. It remains a big event today, held on the third Monday in October and the weekend prior. Approximately 130,000 people from all parts of the country gather for the four-day event that specializes in many different arts and crafts, food and music.

Mount Sterling is also home to Ruth Hunt Candies, a confectionery store created by Ruth Tharpe Hunt in 1921. Ruth Hunt Candies now sells over 70 different kinds of candy.

The Gateway Regional Arts Center holds classes and exhibitions in the former First United Methodist Church, a historic building listed on the National Register of Historic Places.

== List of Registered Historical Places ==
- Bondurant House
- Chesapeake and Ohio Railroad Passenger and Baggage Depots
- Church of the Ascension
- Confederate Monument of Mt. Sterling
- East Mt. Sterling Historic District
- Enoch Smith House
- Gaitskill Mound Archeological Site
- John Bell Hood House
- KEAS Tabernacle Christian Methodist Episcopal Church
- Machpelah Cemetery
- Methodist Episcopal Church South
- Miss Emma Hicks Bungalow
- Monarch Milling Company
- Mt. Sterling Commercial District
- Northwest Residential District
- Ralph Morgan Stone House
- W. T. Fitzpatrick House
- William Chiles House
- Wright-Greene Mound Complex

== Education ==
It is in the Montgomery County School District, and is home to Montgomery County High School.

Mount Sterling has a lending library, a branch of the Montgomery County Public Library.

== Notable people ==
- Lawrence Chenault (1877–1943), silent film actor
- Henry Daniel (1786–1873), congressman from Kentucky
- Amos Davis (1794–1835), congressman from Kentucky
- Ernie Fletcher (born 1952), governor of Kentucky (2003–2007)
- Nancy Green (1834–1923), the original Aunt Jemima
- James Shelton Hathaway (1859–1930) educator, college president, academic administrator, and newspaper publisher
- Robert E. Payne (born 1941), United States district judge
- Josephine B. Sneed (1899–1986), commissioner of Cook County, Illinois
- Samuel J. W. Spurgeon (1861–?), African American minister, publisher, and editor
- Jeremy Sumpter (born 1989), actor
- James L. White (1947–2015), screenwriter known for Ray
- Andrew T. Wood, (1834–1915), lawyer and politician
