= Battle of Mount Sterling =

Battle of the American Civil War

Coordinates: 38°3.414′N 83°56.586′W

- Part of the American Civil War
Date	June 8–9, 1864
Location	Mount Sterling, Kentucky
Result	Union victory

Belligerents
United States	Confederate States

Commanders and leaders
General Stephen G. Burbridge	Colonel Leroy Cluke; General John H. Morgan; Colonel R. M. Martin; Colonel H. L. Giltner

Strength
300	

Casualties and losses
4 killed, 10 wounded	8 killed, 13 wounded

The Battle of Mount Sterling was a minor action in the American Civil War that occurred in June 1864 in Mount Sterling, Kentucky.

== Background ==
U.S. and C.S. forces alternated control of Mount Sterling during the American Civil War. On March 22, 1863, about 300 Confederate cavalrymen under Colonel Leroy Cluke captured the city, taking 438 prisoners, 222 wagon loads of military goods, 500 mules, and 1000 stand of arms. Confederate troops burned the Mount Sterling courthouse, resulting in the loss of early city records. About one-half of Kentucky county courthouses were deliberately burned down during the Civil War, resulting in a vast loss of records.

== Battle ==
On June 8, 1864, General John Hunt Morgan's Cavalry attacked U.S. forces guarding a vital supply depot at Mount Sterling. The C.S. forces attacked the U.S. Army camp in Mount Sterling under the command of Captain Edward Barlow. The Confederates captured 380 prisoners and material and took $59,000 from Farmers' Bank. Leaving a force under Colonel H. L. Giltner, Morgan moved west with the 2nd Brigade.

Early in the morning on June 9, 1864, U.S. forces under General Stephen G. Burbridge attacked the Confederates camped on Camargo Pike under the command of Colonel R. M. Martin. Colonel H. L. Giltner brought a force from Levee Road to support Martin's besieged men, but both forces were driven back through the town. The Confederate counterattack failed to overcome the opposing force, and losses were incurred on both sides.

The battle continued sporadically throughout the surrounding countryside, leaving relics like ammunition and sabers buried in the ground, some of which are still being found as fields are plowed. The battle ended with the defeat of the outnumbered Confederates, marking the last of the actual fighting for Montgomery County, Kentucky. The aftermath of the battle included 8 killed, 13 wounded for the Confederates and 4 killed, 10 wounded for the United States.
