= Jeffersontown, Kentucky =

- City
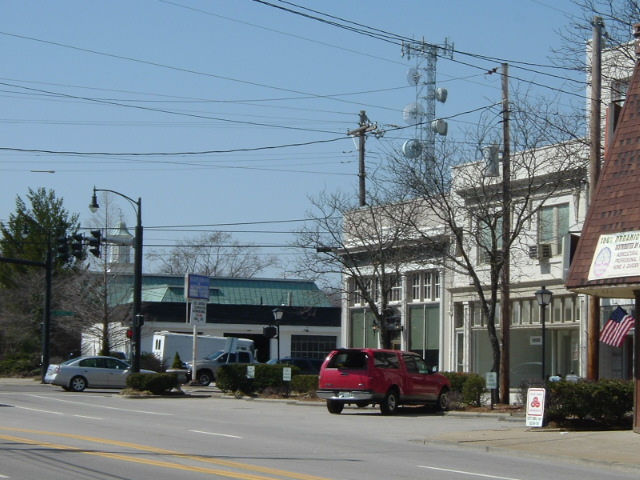
- Jeffersontown's Gaslight Square

- Seal
- Nickname: J-town
- Motto: Where Community And Commerce Meet
- Location of Jeffersontown in Jefferson County, Kentucky.

- Location within the state of Kentucky Jeffersontown (the United States)
- Coordinates: 38°12′17″N 85°34′10″W
- Country: United States
- State: Kentucky
- County: Jefferson
- Incorporated: 1797
- Named for: then-Vice Pres. Thomas Jefferson

Government
  - Type: Mayor–council
  - Mayor: Carol Pike

Area
  - Total: 10.61 sq mi (27.48 km^{2})
  - Land: 10.58 sq mi (27.39 km^{2})
  - Water: 0.039 sq mi (0.10 km^{2})
- Elevation: 637 ft (194 m)

Population (2020)
  - Total: 28,474
  - Density: 2,692.9/sq mi (1,039.75/km^{2})
- Time zone: UTC−5 (Eastern (EST))
  - Summer (DST): UTC−4 (EDT)
- ZIP codes: 40220, 40223, 40269, 40291, 40299
- Area code: 502
- FIPS code: 21-40222
- GNIS feature ID: 2404797
- Website: jeffersontownky.com

Jeffersontown is a city in Jefferson County, Kentucky, United States. The population was 28,474 at the 2020 census. Jeffersontown is a major suburb of Louisville. When the Louisville Metro government was established in 2003, Jeffersontown chose to retain its status as an independent city. It is the metro area's largest municipality outside Louisville. Locally, the city is often referred to by the abbreviated name J-town.

== History ==
Before European exploration, this was occupied by succeeding cultures of Native Americans. They hunted the area for its rich game, including bison herds. The bison created paths through the forests and meadows for their seasonal migrations that were later used by Native Americans and, in turn, by Europeans and Americans alike.

Located in southeastern Jefferson County, along the north central border of Kentucky, Jeffersontown was initially developed in the late 1700s as a stopover and trading station for early European-American pioneers on their way to the Falls of the Ohio at Louisville. Farmers began to cultivate the rich land, which was surveyed by Thomas Bullitt in 1773 and John Floyd the next year. The Hites, Tylers, and Oldhams all settled the area under land grants given to veterans for military service following the American Revolutionary War, as the new government was cash poor.

In 1794, Abraham Bruner purchased 122 acres (49 ha) of land. In May 1797, he successfully petitioned the Jefferson County Fiscal Court to incorporate a 40-acre (16 ha) section of his land as the city of Jefferson – named either after the county or after Thomas Jefferson, then the vice president of the United States. The city was long known as Bruner's Town or Brunerstown by its inhabitants, but the usage Jefferson Town eventually became adopted as its present name.

A large, 600-acre area from the pioneer days has been preserved since the late 20th century and recognized as the Tyler Settlement Rural Historic District. It is used largely for agricultural purposes. This district is east of Jeffersontown; it contains several of the Tylers' original log cabins and barns. A large portion of the Tyler settlement is known as the Blackacre Nature Preserve. This 170-acre tract is used by Jefferson County public schools as part of their environmental education.

== Geography ==
According to the United States Census Bureau, the city has a total area of 10.0 square miles (26 km^{2}), of which 9.9 square miles (26 km^{2}) is land and 0.10% is water.

== Demographics ==
=== 2020 census ===
As of the 2020 census, Jeffersontown had a population of 28,474. The median age was 39.8 years. 21.2% of residents were under the age of 18 and 18.8% of residents were 65 years of age or older. For every 100 females there were 93.1 males, and for every 100 females age 18 and over there were 90.1 males age 18 and over.

100.0% of residents lived in urban areas, while 0.0% lived in rural areas.

There were 12,083 households in Jeffersontown, of which 28.5% had children under the age of 18 living in them. Of all households, 46.3% were married-couple households, 18.3% were households with a male householder and no spouse or partner present, and 28.7% were households with a female householder and no spouse or partner present. About 30.8% of all households were made up of individuals and 12.3% had someone living alone who was 65 years of age or older.

There were 12,720 housing units, of which 5.0% were vacant. The homeowner vacancy rate was 0.7% and the rental vacancy rate was 8.8%.

Racial composition as of the 2020 census
| Race | Number | Percent |
|---|---|---|
| White | 20,628 | 72.4% |
| Black or African American | 3,349 | 11.8% |
| American Indian and Alaska Native | 87 | 0.3% |
| Asian | 1,252 | 4.4% |
| Native Hawaiian and Other Pacific Islander | 19 | 0.1% |
| Some other race | 1,003 | 3.5% |
| Two or more races | 2,136 | 7.5% |
| Hispanic or Latino (of any race) | 2,183 | 7.7% |

=== 2010 census ===
As of the census of 2010, there were 26,595 people, 10,653 households, and 7,275 families residing in the city. The population density was 2,675.9 inhabitants per square mile (1,033.2/km^{2}). There were 11,220 housing units at an average density of 1,127.3 per square mile (435.3/km^{2}). The racial makeup of the city was 82.2% White, 11.1% African American, 0.2% Native American, 1.8% Asian, 0.1% Pacific Islander, 2.1% from other races, and 2.5% from two or more races. Hispanic or Latino of any race were 5.04% of the population.

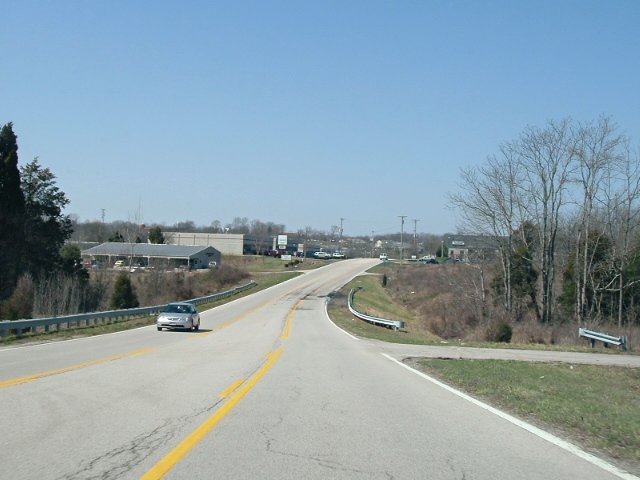
Blankenbaker Access Drive (westbound) in Jeffersontown

There were 10,653 households, out of which 32.9% had children under the age of 18 living with them, 54.3% were married couples living together, 10.7% had a female householder with no husband present, and 31.7% were non-families. 26.4% of all households were made up of individuals, and 6.4% had someone living alone who was 65 years of age or older. The average household size was 2.46 and the average family size was 2.99.

Historical population
| Census | Pop. | Note | %± |
|---|---|---|---|
| 1860 | 315 | | — |
| 1880 | 243 | | — |
| 1890 | 348 | | 43.2% |
| 1910 | 345 | | — |
| 1920 | 350 | | 1.4% |
| 1930 | 614 | | 75.4% |
| 1940 | 899 | | 46.4% |
| 1950 | 1,246 | | 38.6% |
| 1960 | 3,431 | | 175.4% |
| 1970 | 9,701 | | 182.7% |
| 1980 | 15,795 | | 62.8% |
| 1990 | 23,221 | | 47.0% |
| 2000 | 26,633 | | 14.7% |
| 2010 | 26,595 | | −0.1% |
| 2020 | 28,474 | | 7.1% |
| 2025 (est.) | 29,193 | | 2.5% |
U.S. Decennial Census

In the city, the population was spread out, with 24.8% under the age of 18, 7.7% from 18 to 24, 33.4% from 25 to 44, 23.3% from 45 to 64, and 10.8% who were 65 years of age or older. The median age was 36 years. For every 100 females, there were 92.8 males. For every 100 females age 18 and over, there were 89.1 males.

The median income for a household in the city was $51,999, and the median income for a family was $60,951. Males had a median income of $41,345 versus $29,537 for females. The per capita income for the city was $23,977. About 3.7% of families and 4.3% of the population were below the poverty line, including 5.4% of those under age 18 and 5.4% of those age 65 or over.

== Economy ==
The Bluegrass Commerce Park (formerly known as The Bluegrass Research & Industrial Park) opened in 1966 and encompasses 600 acres (2.4 km^{2}). It was the first such development in the United States. Today, Bluegrass Commerce Park has expanded to more than 1,800 acres (7.3 km^{2}) and is home to approximately 850 businesses. The park is the largest in the state of Kentucky. The 38,000 employees who work there make the park and Jeffersontown the third-largest city of employment in the state. The park's seven units include:

- Bluegrass Commerce Park
- Commonwealth Park
- Watterson Trail Industrial Park
- Plainview Office Park
- Jeffersontown Industrial Park
- Holloway Industrial Park
- Blankenbaker Crossings

Papa John's Pizza had its headquarters in Jeffersontown. In November 2020, the company announced its new global headquarters would be moved to the Three Ballpark Center at The Battery Atlanta.

== Government ==
Jeffersontown is a home-rule class city, and operates under a mayor-council system, being governed by a mayor and eight city council members. The mayor serves a four-year term of office while the council members serve two-year terms. The city council members are elected at-large, made up of the top eight candidates receiving the most votes in the general election.

== Education ==
Jeffersontown has a lending library, a branch of the Louisville Free Public Library.

== Notable people ==
- Jon Ackerson, politician who served in both houses of the Kentucky State Legislature; former Jeffersontown city council member

== See also ==
- 2018 Jeffersontown shooting
- Beechland (Jeffersontown, Kentucky)
- Confederate Martyrs Monument in Jeffersontown
