= Church of the Ascension (Mt. Sterling, Kentucky) =

Historic church in Kentucky, United States

- U.S. National Register of Historic Places
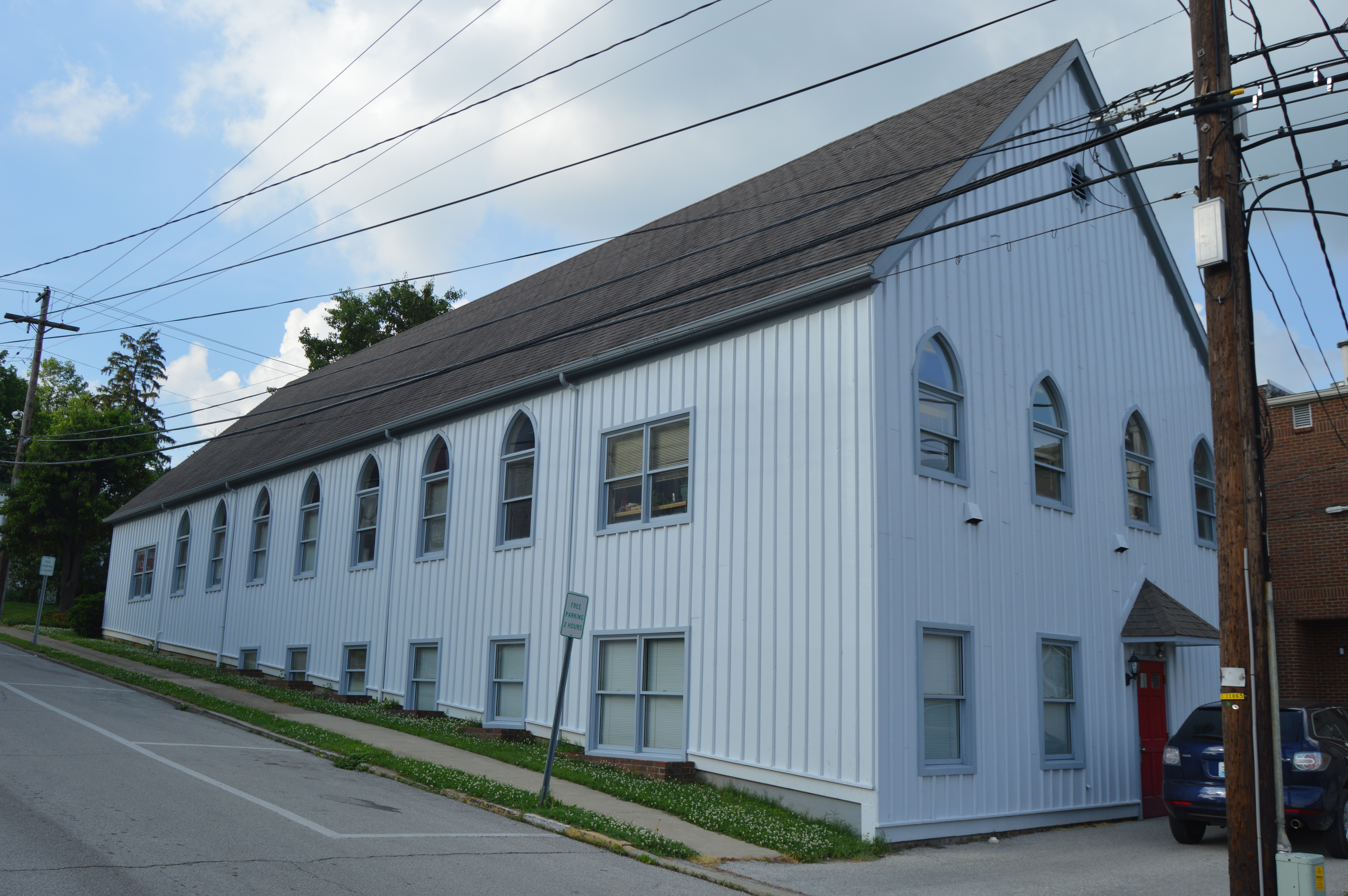
- Western side and rear

- Location within Kentucky Location within the United States
- Location: High and Broadway Sts., Mt. Sterling, Kentucky
- Coordinates: 38°3′26″N 83°56′36″W
- Area: 0.2 acres (0.081 ha)
- Built: 1878
- Architect: Fitch, Frank
- Architectural style: Gothic Revival
- NRHP reference No.: 79001025
- Added to NRHP: July 10, 1979

The Church of the Ascension in Mt. Sterling, Kentucky is a historic Episcopal church at High and Broadway Streets. It was built in 1878 and added to the National Register in 1979.

It is a Gothic Revival-style church designed by architect Frank Fitch in 1878, with board and batten exterior that follows the architectural ideology of A.J. Downing.

The Anglican parish was formed in 1858.
