= Enoch Smith House =

- U.S. National Register of Historic Places
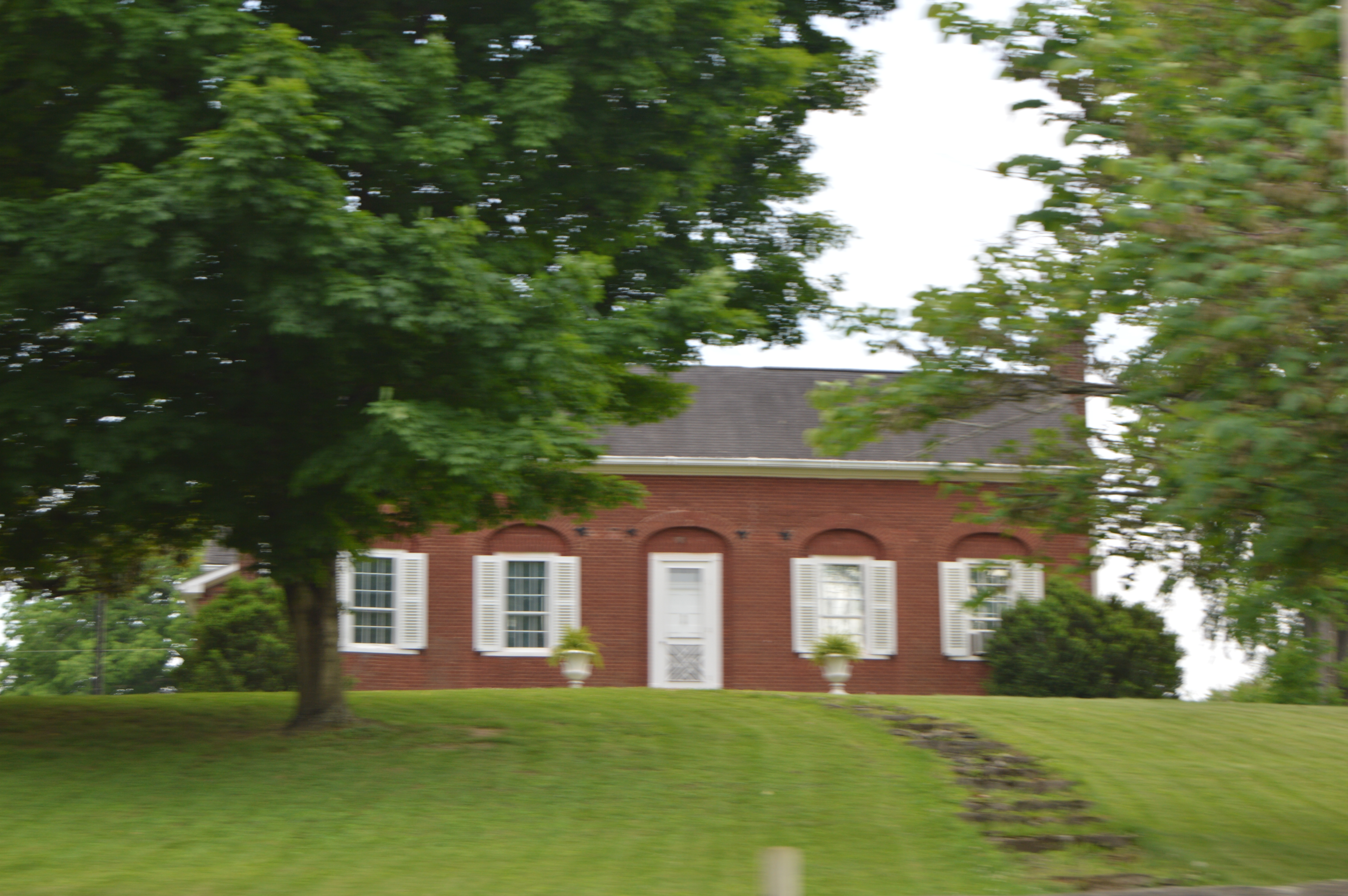

- Location within Kentucky Location within the United States
- Location: SR 1, Mount Sterling, Kentucky
- Coordinates: 38°03′10″N 83°57′41″W
- Area: 0.2 acres (0.081 ha)
- Built: c.1808-1811
- Architectural style: Federal
- NRHP reference No.: 80001660
- Added to NRHP: August 19, 1980

The Enoch Smith House, on Kentucky Route 1 in Mount Sterling, Kentucky, was built around 1808 to 1811. It was listed on the National Register of Historic Places in 1980.

Also known as Happy Hill, it is a one-and-a-half-story single-pile central passage plan house.

It was described as "a particularly clear expression of the early architectural development of Montgomery County. Embodying the basic form and details of the Federal style, the house is distinguished by the recessed panels on the main facade and the delicate interior moldings. Traditionally considered to have been built by Enoch Smith, Sr., on land he settled in 1776, the house derives additional significance through the association with Smith, one of the county's original settlers and a key figure in the establishment of the county seat of Mt. Sterling."
