= Beechland (Natchez, Mississippi) =

Historic house in Mississippi, United States

- U.S. National Register of Historic Places
- Location within Mississippi Location within the United States
- Location: One mile north of the Hutchins Landing Road exactly five miles east of U.S. Highway 61 South
- Nearest city: Natchez, Mississippi
- Coordinates: 31°23′41″N 91°19′11″W
- Architectural style: Greek Revival
- NRHP reference No.: 82000567
- Added to NRHP: November 4, 1982

Beechland, near Natchez, Mississippi, is a historic vernacular Greek Revival-style plantation house at the end of a mile-long plantation drive. It is listed on the National Register of Historic Places.

It is a one-and-a-half-story frame house set upon brick foundation piers. It has a steeply pitched gabled roof pierced by two interior brick chimneys.

It was listed on the National Register in 1982; the owner then planned to renovate the house.
