= Mount Sterling United Methodist Church =

Historic church in Kentucky, United States

- Methodist Episcopal Church South
- U.S. National Register of Historic Places
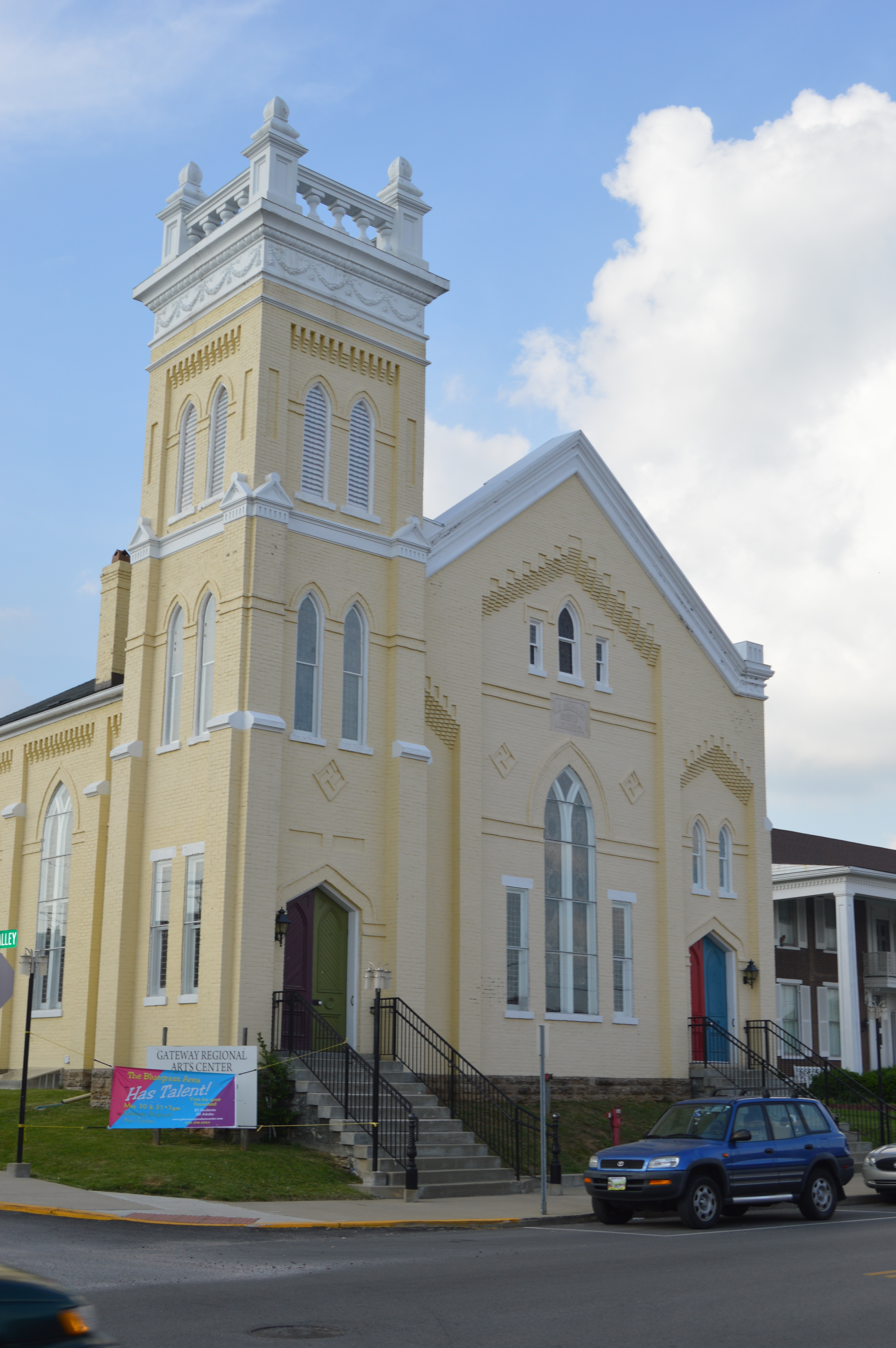
- Front and a little of the western side

- Location within Kentucky Location within the United States
- Location: Jct. of E. Main and N. Wilson Sts., Mount Sterling, Kentucky
- Coordinates: 38°3′32″N 83°56′26″W
- Area: 0.3 acres (0.12 ha)
- Built: 1883
- Architectural style: Gothic
- MPS: Mount Sterling MPS
- NRHP reference No.: 91000426
- Added to NRHP: April 23, 1991

The Methodist Episcopal Church South in Mount Sterling, Kentucky is a historic church at the junction of E. Main and N. Wilson Streets. It was built in 1883 and added to the National Register of Historic Places in 1991.

It is a two-story brick building with a gable roof and a three-story entry tower.

== Gateway Regional Arts Center ==
Gateway Regional Arts Center, also known as The GRAC, is an art center in Mt. Sterling, Kentucky. It is affiliated with the Montgomery County Council for the Arts. The center is located at 101 East Main Street in downtown Mount Sterling.

The Arts Center hosts exhibits and classes. The building is a readapted former First United Methodist Church built in 1883. It is listed on the National Register of Historic Places. The Arts Center includes a library and gallery space.

In 2017 the venue hosted SoapCon, a conference celebrating soap making.
