= Beechland (Jeffersontown, Kentucky) =

Historic house in Kentucky, United States

- U.S. National Register of Historic Places
- Location within Kentucky Location within the United States
- Location: Jeffersontown, Kentucky
- Coordinates: 38°11′43″N 85°35′53″W
- Area: 0.4 acres (0.16 ha)
- Built: 1812
- MPS: Jefferson County MRA
- NRHP reference No.: 83002633
- Added to NRHP: July 12, 1983

Beechland, in Jeffersontown, Kentucky, was built in 1812. It was listed on the National Register of Historic Places in 1983. The listing included three contributing buildings.

It is a two-story, three-bay, brick side hall plan house with a Flemish bond front facade, with a two-story original ell and a later one-story ell.

The property included a brick smokehouse and a one-story, brick slave quarters, plus later non-contributing farm buildings.

The house was moved to 8808 Stara Way, at 38°11′43″N 85°35′53″W. It previously was located at 8500 Six Mile Lane before suburb construction.
